= Garamond =

Typeface family

- Category: Serif
- Classification: Old-style; Garalde
- Designers: Claude Garamond; Also: Robert Granjon; Jean Jannon
- Date created: c. 1549
- Shown here: Adobe Garamond Pro (roman style based on Garamond's work, italic on the work of Robert Granjon)

Garamond is a group of many serif typefaces, named for sixteenth-century Parisian engraver Claude Garamond, generally spelled as Garamont in his lifetime. Garamond-style typefaces are popular to this day and often used for book printing and body text.

Garamond's types followed the model of an influential typeface cut for Venetian printer Aldus Manutius by his punchcutter Francesco Griffo in 1495, and are in what is now called the old-style of serif letter design, letters with a relatively organic structure resembling handwriting with a pen, but with a slightly more structured, upright design.

Following an eclipse in popularity in the eighteenth and nineteenth century, many modern revival faces in the Garamond style have been developed. It is common to pair these with italics based on those created by his contemporary Robert Granjon, who was well known for his proficiency in this genre. Although Garamond himself is considered a major figure in French printing of the sixteenth century, historical research has increasingly placed him in context as one artisan punchcutter among many active at a time of rapid production of new typefaces in sixteenth-century France, and research has only slowly developed into which fonts were cut by him and which by contemporaries; Robert Bringhurst commented that "it was a widespread custom for many years to attribute almost any good sixteenth-century French font" to Garamond. As a result, while "Garamond" is a common term in the printing industry, the terms "French Renaissance antiqua" and "Garalde" have been used in academic writing to refer generally to fonts on the Aldus-French Renaissance model by Garamond and others.

In particular, many Garamond revivals of the early twentieth century are actually based on the work of a later punchcutter, Jean Jannon, whose noticeably different work was for some years misattributed to Garamond. The most common digital font named Garamond is Monotype Garamond. Developed in the early 1920s and bundled with Microsoft Office, it is a revival of Jannon's work.

== Characteristics ==
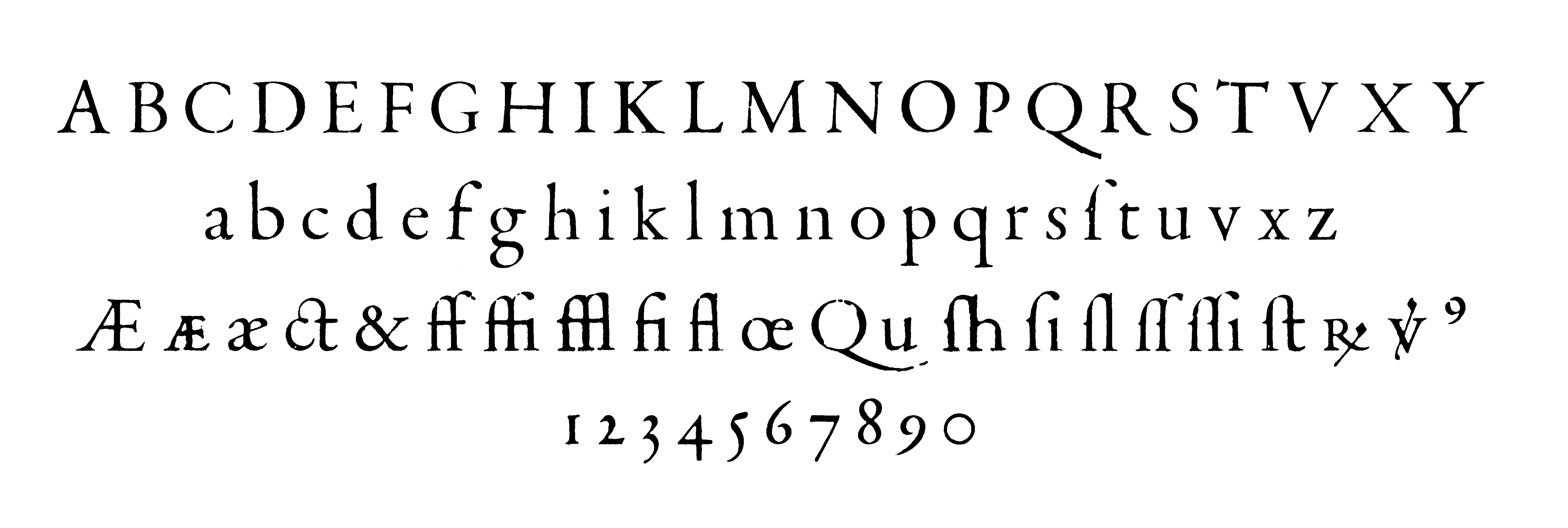
Great Primer type (c. 18 pt) by Garamond, cast from surviving matrices in the Plantin-Moretus Museum

Some distinctive characteristics in Garamond's letterforms are an 'e' with a small eye and the bowl of the 'a' which has a sharp turn at top left. Other general features are limited-but-clear stroke contrast and capital letters on the model of Roman square capitals. The 'M' is slightly splayed with outward-facing serifs at the top (sometimes only on the left) and the leg of the 'R' extends outwards from the letter. The x-height (height of lower-case letters) is low, especially at larger sizes, making the capitals large relative to the lower case, while the top serifs on the ascenders of letters like 'd' have a downward slope and ride above the cap height. The axis of letters like the 'o' is diagonal and the bottom right of the italic 'h' bends inwards. Garamond types have quite expansive ascenders and descenders; printers at the time did not use leading.

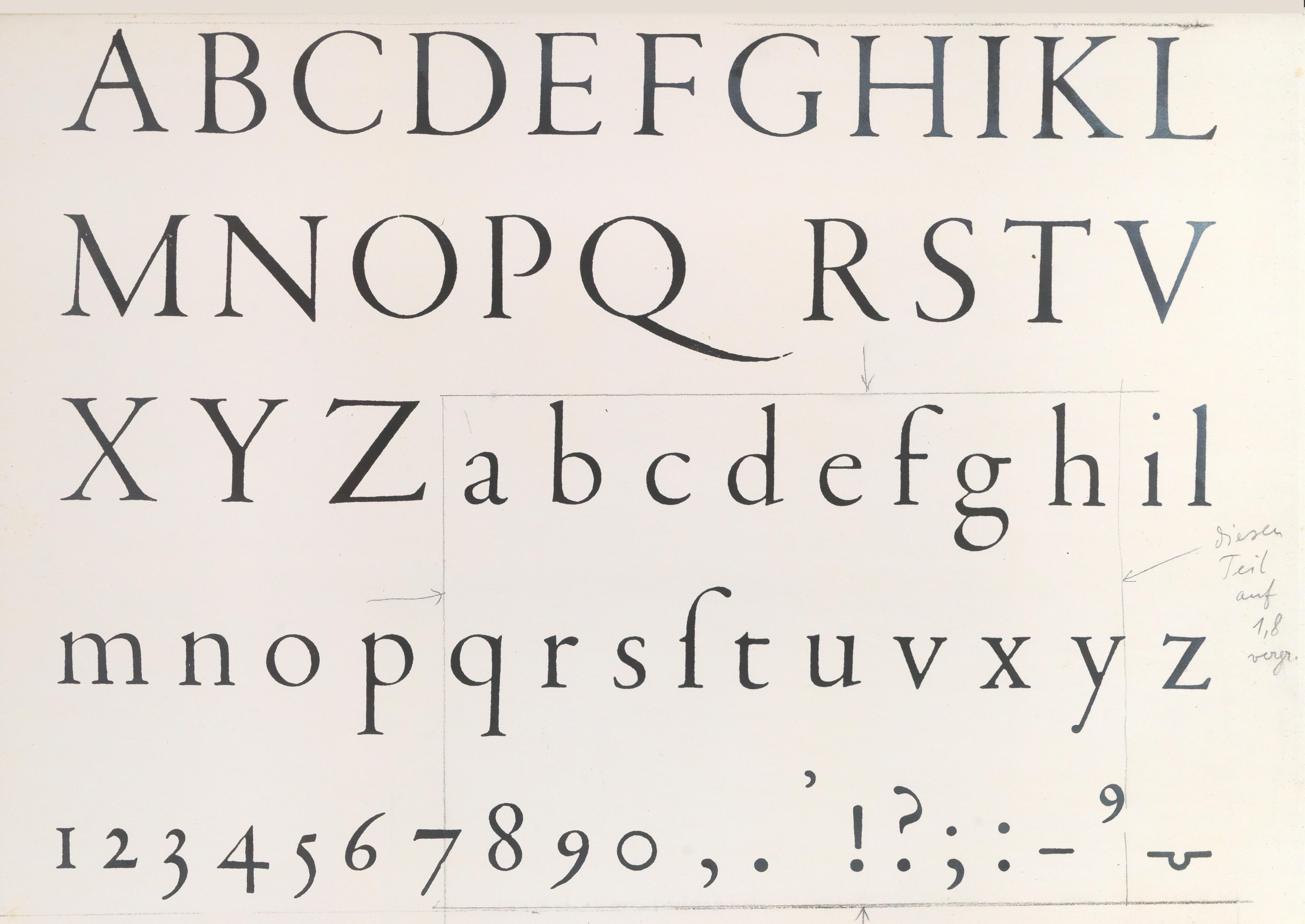
Garamond's largest type, in "Gros Canon" size (40 pt), for H. D. L. Vervliet "a culmination of Renaissance design".

Besides general characteristics, writers on type have generally praised the even quality of Garamond's type: John A. Lane describes his work as "elegant and executed with consummate skill…to a higher standard than commercial interest demanded"; H. D. L. Vervliet wrote that in his later Gros-Canon and Parangonne types (meaning sizes of around 40pt and 18pt respectively) he had achieved "a culmination of Renaissance design. The elegant line and subdued emphasis show the classic search for silent and transparent form". (Note: However, this is a statement from early in Vervliet's career. In his later career Vervliet came to believe that Garamond's types were based on others cut by a punchcutter named "Constantin"-see below.)

Modern Garamond revivals also often add a matching bold and 'lining' numbers at the height of capital letters, neither of which were used during the Renaissance; Arabic numerals in Garamond's time were engraved as what are now called text figures, styled with variable height like lower-case letters.

== History ==
=== Garamond’s life and his roman type ===
'Petit-texte' type intended for body text, created by Garamond.

Garamond worked as an engraver of punches, the masters used to stamp matrices, the moulds used to cast metal type. (Note: This is a slight simplification - technically the mould is an interchangeable part which is clamped around a matrix to cast type. However, the matrix is the mould for the letterform part of a sort.) Garamond cut types in the 'roman', or upright style, in italic, and Greek. (Note: A Le Bé foundry inventory also records a very small blackletter cut by Garamond. No printing using it is known, although Harry Carter suggested a type in the Delacolonge specimen book could be it with some altered characters.) In the period of Garamond's early life roman type had been displacing the blackletter or Gothic type which was used in some (although not all) early French printing. Though his name was generally written as 'Garamont' in his lifetime, the spelling 'Garamond' became the most commonly used form after his death. H. D. L. Vervliet, the leading contemporary expert on French Renaissance printing, uses Garamont consistently.

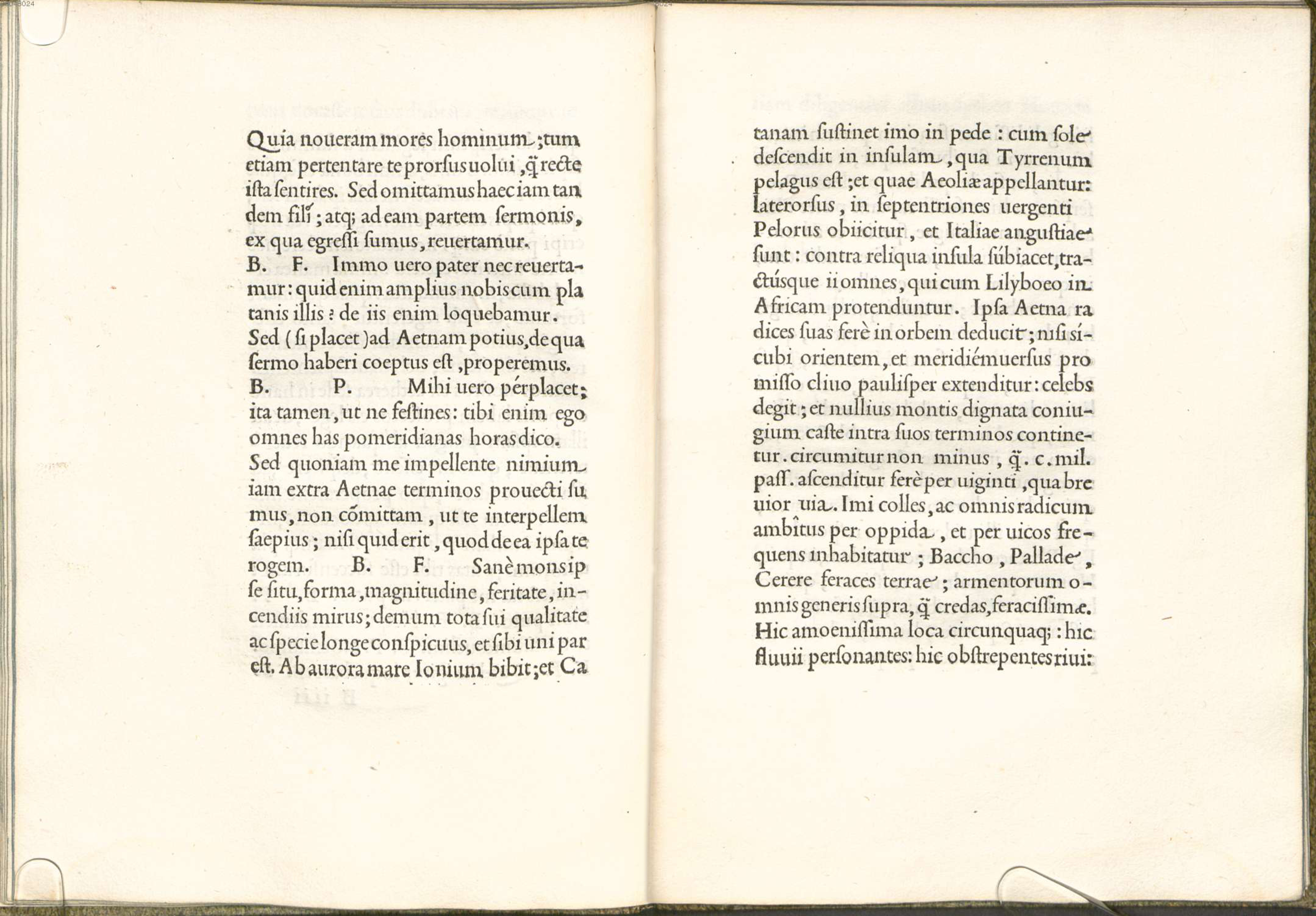
De Aetna, printed by Aldus Manutius in 1495. Its roman type was the model for Garamond's.

The roman designs of Garamond which are his most imitated were based on a font cut around 1495 for the Venetian printer Aldus Manutius by engraver Francesco Griffo. This was first used in the book De Aetna, a short work by poet and cleric Pietro Bembo which was Manutius' first printing in the Latin alphabet. Historian Beatrice Warde has assessed De Aetna as something of a pilot project, a small book printed to a higher standard than Manutius' norm. Among other details, this font popularised the idea that in printing the cross-stroke of the 'e' should be level instead of slanting upwards to the right like handwriting, something imitated in almost all type designs since. French typefounders of the 16th century assiduously examined Manutius's work (and, it is thought, De Aetna in particular) as a source of inspiration: Garamond's roman, italic and Greek typefaces were all influenced by types used by Manutius.

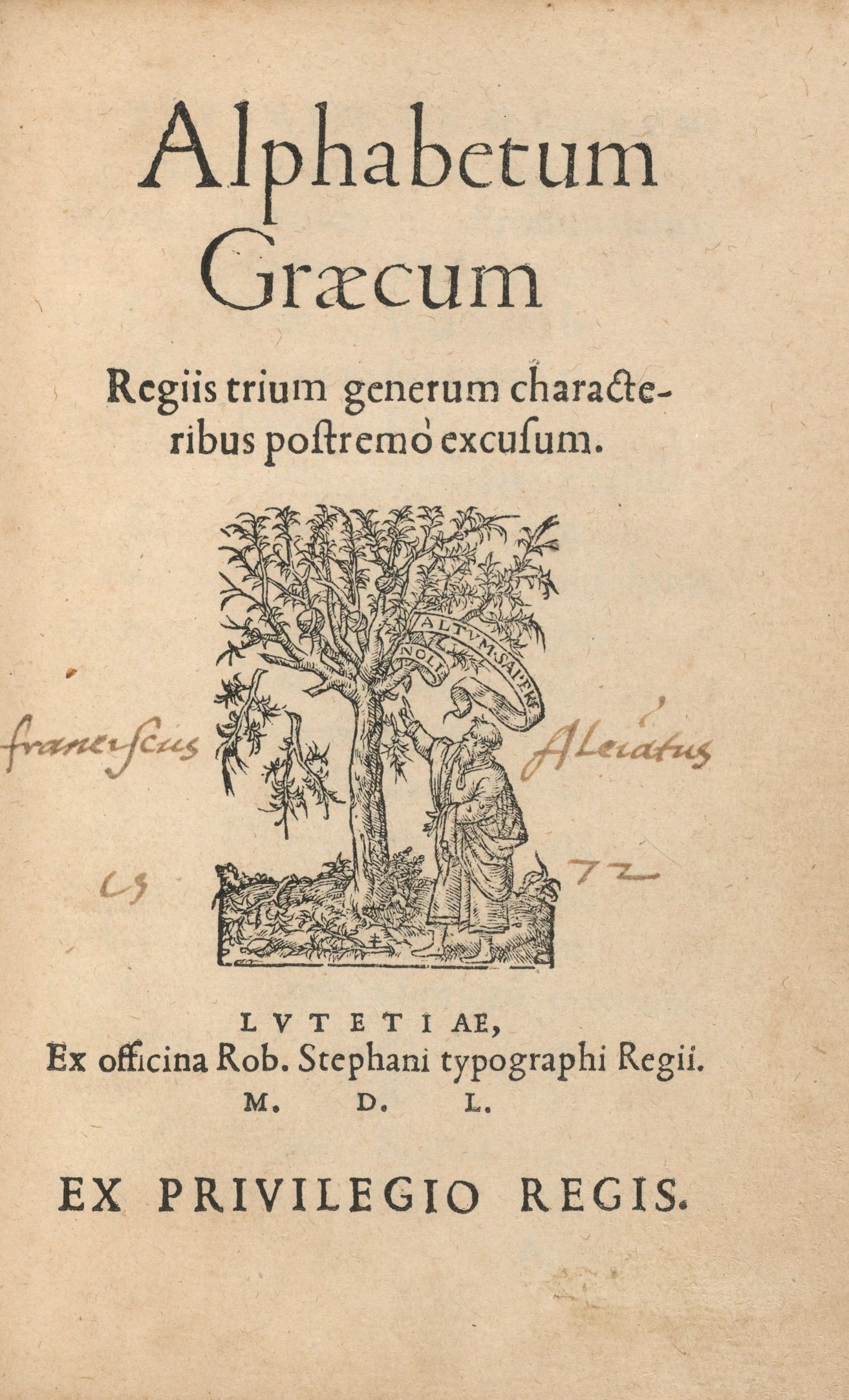
A book printed by Robert Estienne in 1550. His graceful and delicate typefaces, based on the work of Aldus Manutius thirty-five years earlier, redefined practices in French printing. Below: his text type and Garamond's "gros canon" type, his largest, based on this type.

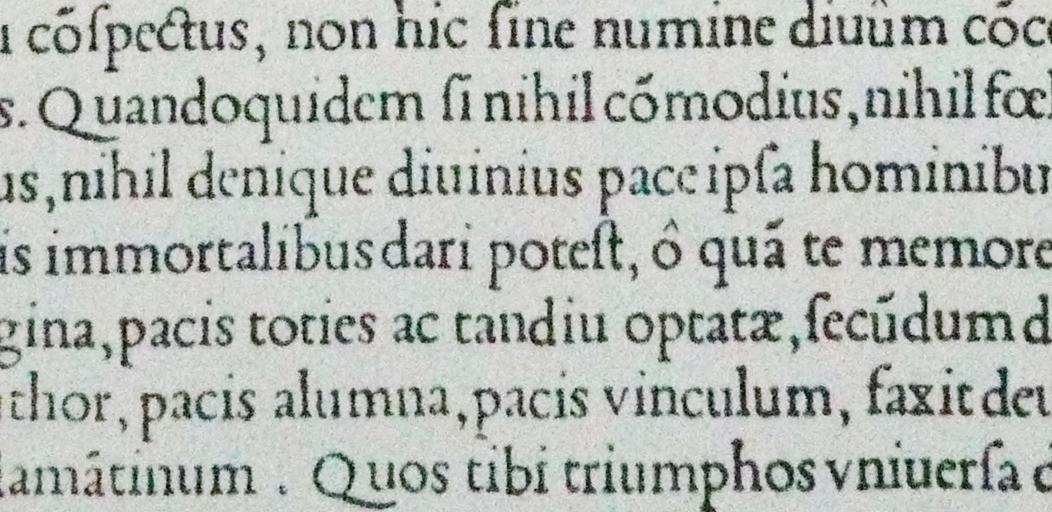
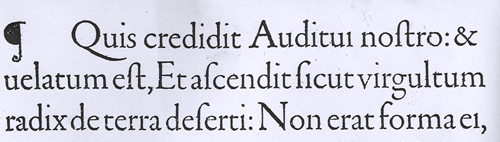

An event which was to particularly define the course of the rest of Garamond's career came starting on 6 September 1530, when the printer Robert Estienne began to introduce a set of three (Note: Later five) roman types adapting the single roman type used in De Aetna to a range of sizes. These typefaces, with their "light colour and precise cut" were extremely influential and other Parisian printers immediately introduced copies. The largest size "Gros-canon" (42.5pt) (Note: Anglo-American point size; 40pt Didot scale) particularly became a "phenomenon" in Paris: never before had a roman type been cut in so large a size. The designs copied Manutius's type even to the extent of copying the 'M' shown in De Aetna which, whether intentionally or due to a casting defect, had no serif pointing out of the letter at top right. This form was to appear in many fonts of the period, including Garamond's earlier ones, although by the end of his career he had switched to mostly using an M on the Roman capital model with a serif at top right.

The period from 1520 to around 1560, encompassing Garamond's career, was an extremely busy period for typeface creation. Many fonts were cut, some such as Robert Estienne's for a single printer's exclusive use, others sold or traded between them (increasingly over time). The many active engravers included Garamond himself, Granjon, Guillaume Le Bé, particularly respected for his Hebrew fonts, Pierre Haultin, Antoine Augereau (who may have been Garamond's master), Estienne's stepfather Simon de Colines and others. This period saw the creation of a pool of high-quality punches and matrices, many of which would remain used for the next two centuries.

Little is known about Garamond's life or work before 1540, although he wrote in a preface of having cut punches for type since childhood. He worked for a variety of employers on commission, creating punches and selling matrices to publishers and the government. Garamond's typefaces were popular abroad, and replaced Griffo's original roman type at the Aldine Press in Venice. He also worked as a publisher and bookseller. By 1549, a document from theologian Jean de Gagny specified that the goldsmith Charles Chiffin, who had cut an italic for his private printing press, should receive payment at the rate of "the best punchcutter in this city after master Claude Garamont", clearly showing that he was considered the pre-eminent punchcutter in Paris at this time.

Vervliet concludes that Garamond created thirty-four typefaces for which an attribution can be confidently made (17 roman, 7 italic, 8 Greek, 2 Hebrew) and another three for which the attribution is problematic (one each of roman, Greek and Hebrew). If Garamond distributed specimens of his typefaces, as later punchcutters and typefounders did, none is known to survive, although one unsigned specimen in the Plantin-Moretus Museum collection, presenting a synopsis of his late Parangon type, may have been made around the time of his death or soon after. (Note: Lane suggests it was probably made in Antwerp for Plantin by Hendrik van den Keere.)

While some records such as Christophe Plantin's exist of what exact types were cut by Garamond himself, many details of his career remain uncertain: early estimates placed Garamond's date of birth around 1480, but modern opinion proposes much later estimates. A document called the Le Bé Memorandum (based on the memories of Guillaume Le Bé, but collated by one of his sons around 1643) suggests that Garamond finished his apprenticeship around 1510. This is considered unlikely by modern historians since his mother was still alive when he died in 1561 and little is known of him before around 1540.

One particular question about Garamond's early career is whether he cut the typefaces used by Estienne from 1530. Because of Garamond's known connection with Estienne in his later career, it has been assumed that he cut them, but this was not mentioned in contemporary sources: Vervliet suggests that these 'Estienne typefaces' were not cut by Garamond and that his career began somewhat later. Vervliet suggests that the creator of this set of typefaces, sometimes called the 'Estienne Master', may have been a 'Master Constantin', recorded in the Le Bé Memorandum as a master type engraver of the period before Garamond but about whom nothing is otherwise known and to whom no obvious other body of work can be ascribed. (Note: Regarding Constantin, Carter (who believed that the Estienne romans were by Garamond) suggested very tentatively that he might have had some connection to a known book editor from Lyon with the same surname, and notes that the document previously mentions that the Aldine style was imitated in Lyon and in Paris. A counter-suggestion is that of Kay Amert, who proposed that Estienne's typefaces were variant states of ones used, and probably cut by, his stepfather Simon de Colines, but Vervliet rejects this as unlikely: "it seems unlikely that Estienne would have parted from his punches or that Colines would have refurbished them to an inferior level.") If so, his disappearance from history (perhaps due to an early death, since all his presumed work appeared in just four years from 1530 to 1533) and the execution of Augereau on a charge of heresy in 1534 may have allowed Garamond's reputation to develop in the following decade.

Regardless of these questions about his early career, Garamond's late career is well-recorded, with most of his later roman types (in Lane's view, his best work) preserved in complete sets of matrices at the Museum Plantin-Moretus, which has allowed example sets of characters to be cast, with further documentation and attributions from later inventories and specimen sheets. Of the Garamond types preserved, all include small capitals apart from the gros-canon, and the parangonne uniquely includes terminal swash forms for a e m n r t (two forms) and z. (Note: All the terminal forms apart from the 'm' were digitised with Adobe Garamond Pro.)

==== Italics ====
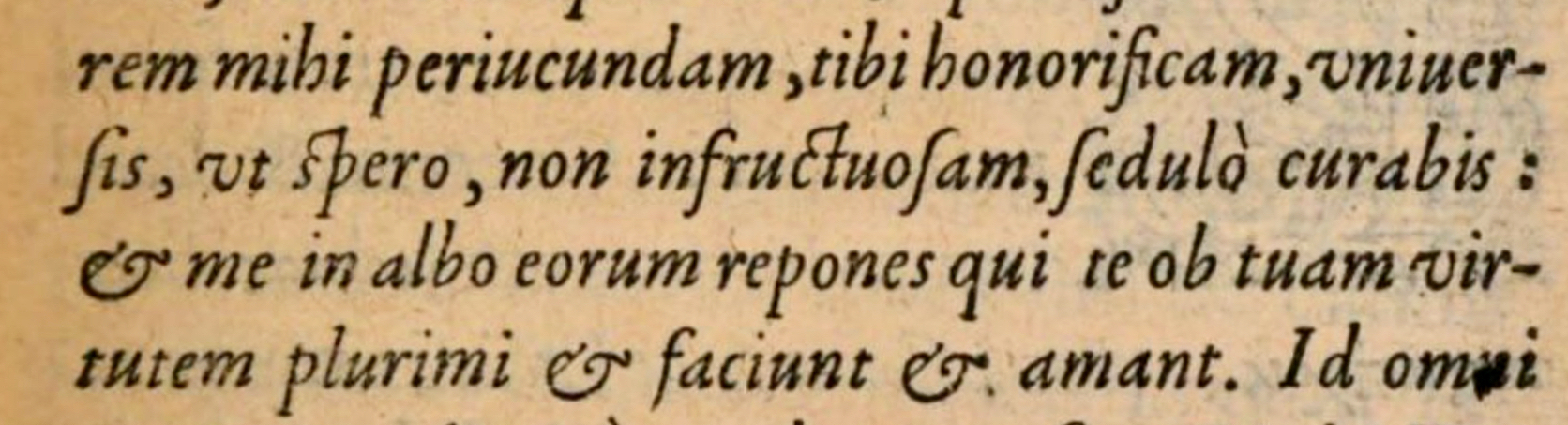
According to Guillaume Le Bé this Great Primer-size italic was cut by Garamond, although it is not known in print until five years after his death. (Note: Hugh Williamson suggested that some uses of this italic included characters not cut by Garamond.)

Garamond cut more roman types than italics, which at the time were conceived separately to roman types rather than designed alongside them as complementary matches.

Italics had again been introduced by Manutius in 1500; the first was cut by Griffo. This first italic used upright capitals, copying a popular style of calligraphy. The modern italic style of sloped capitals first appeared in 1527 and only slowly became popular. Accordingly, many of Garamond's italics were quite small and had upright capitals. Some of his italics did have sloped capitals, although Vervliet did not feel he integrated them effectively into the typeface design, "sloped capitals were (and stayed) a weakness in his designs."

Garamond's italics were apparently not as used as widely as Granjon's and Haultin's, which spread widely across Europe. For example, on the 1592 Berner specimen, most of the romans were by Garamond but at least all but one, and probably all, of the italics are Granjon's. Similarly in the 1643 Imprimerie royale specimen, most of the italics are Granjon's. (Some books published by Garamond in 1545 use a very common italic of the period, not cut by him.)

==== Greek ====
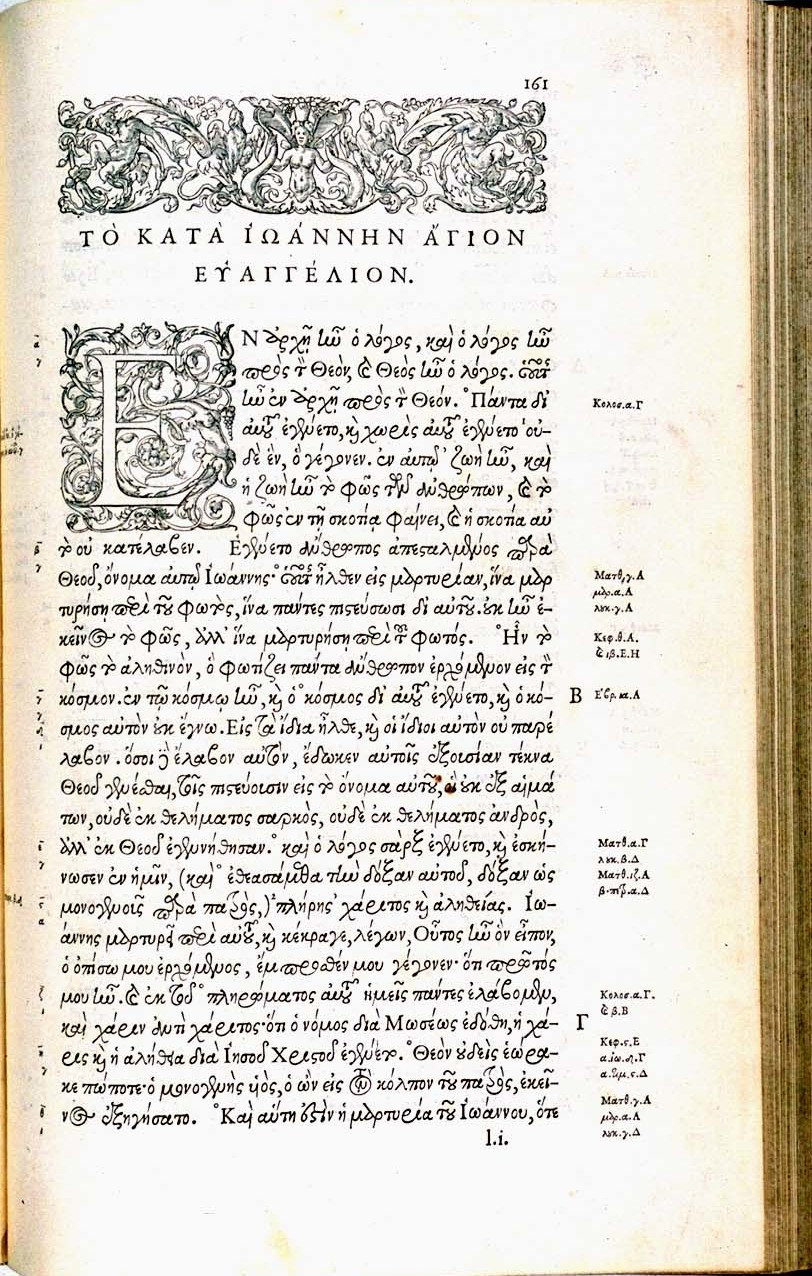
Estienne's 1550 edition of the New Testament was typeset with Garamond's grecs du roi.

Garamond cut type for the Greek alphabet from the beginning of his recorded career: on 2 November 1540 he contracted to cut a series of Greek faces for the French government, to be used in printing by Robert Estienne. The resulting typeface, known as the Grecs du roi, are very different from his Latin designs: again influenced by Greek typefaces used by Manutius (they were cut in three sizes, the same ones Manutius used), they were based on the elegant handwriting of Cretan scribe Angelo Vergecio, who used many ligatures and traditional contractions in his writing, and include an extraordinarily large number of alternate characters to faithfully replicate it. Arthur Tilley called the books printed from them "among the most finished specimens of typography that exist".

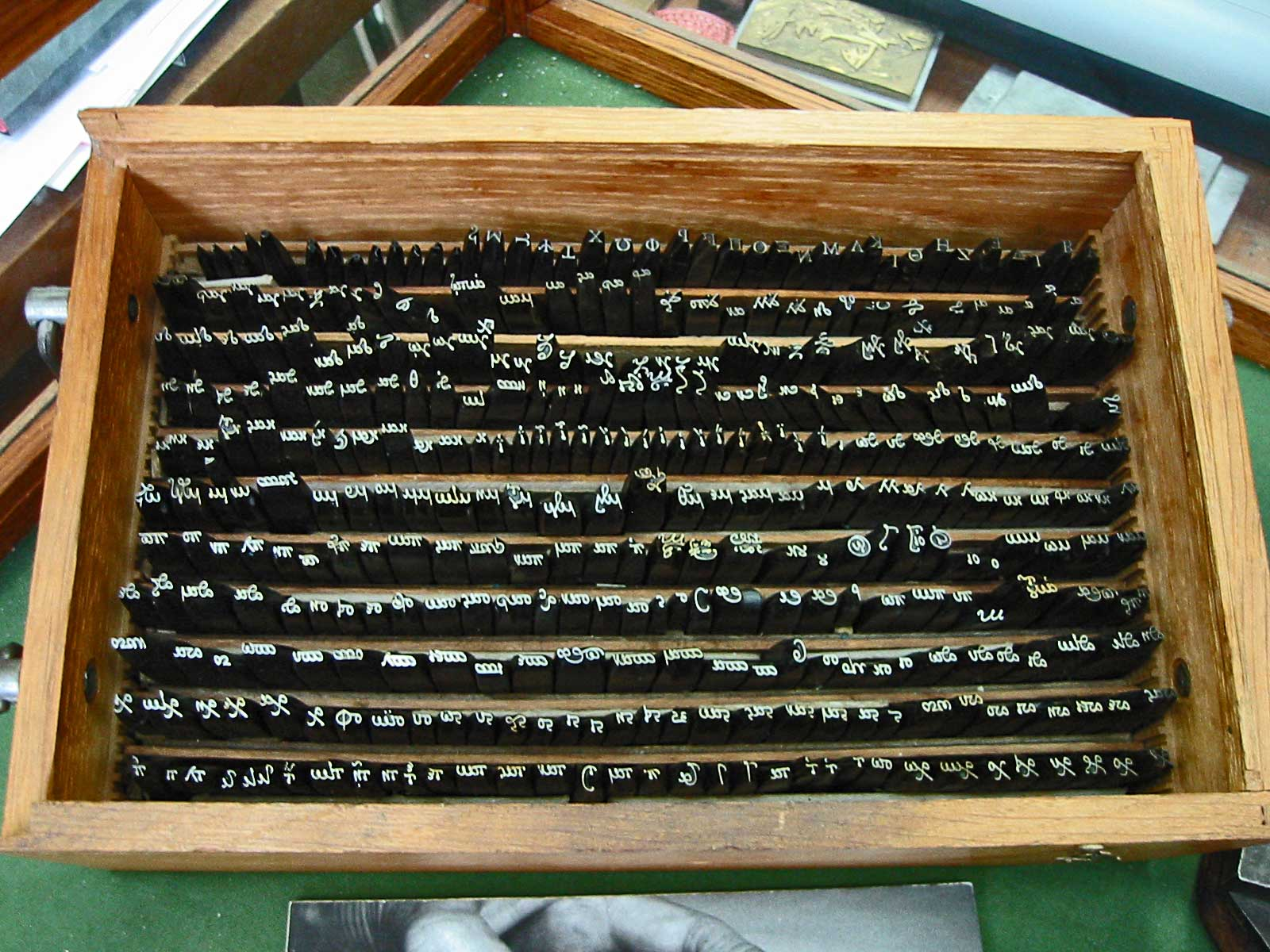
Garamond's punches for the Grecs du roi type

The Grecs du roi punches and matrices remain the property of the French government. They were extremely influential and directly copied by many engravers for other printers, becoming the basis of Greek typeface design for the next two centuries.

Although the Grecs du roi style was popular in Greek printing for the next two centuries, it is problematic for modern setting of body text, due to changing tastes in Greek printing: they are slanted, but modern Greek printing often uses upright type, and because Garamond's types were designed assuming that ligatures would be manually selected and inserted wherever needed; later metal types on the same model used fewer ligatures. (Note: Gerry Leonidas, a leading expert on Greek typesetting, has commented that Vergecio's handwriting "has all the marks of a script that is unsuitable for conversion to [printing]. That it was the model for the widely-copied grecs du roi was, with hindsight, unfortunate.") Digital 'Garamond' releases such as Adobe's with Roman and Greek character sets often re-interpret the Greek, for instance with upright characters. A commercial digitisation from Anagrafi Fonts, KS GrequeX, uses the OpenType format to include over 1100 abbreviations and ligatures, more than Garamond cut.

According to Lane the most influential Grecs du roi copies were those of Granjon and Haultin, but others may have been cut by Jean Arnould and Nicolas de Villiers, amongst others. Another was made by Arthur Nicholls in London.

==== After Garamond's death ====
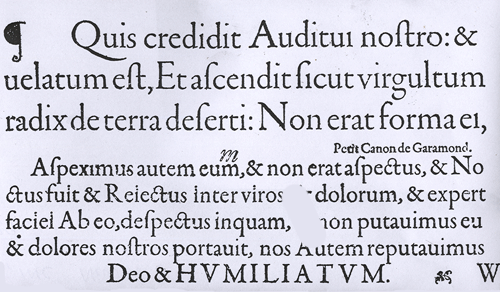
Konrad Berner's 1592 specimen of mostly French typefaces. The top typeface is Garamond's Gros Canon, the one below is (despite the attribution) actually by Robert Granjon.

Garamond died in 1561 and his punches and matrices were sold off by his widow. Purchasers included the Le Bé type foundry in Paris run by the family of Guillaume Le Bé and Christophe Plantin, who was in Paris at the time; the Frankfurt foundry often referred to by historians as Egenolff-Berner also came to acquire materials of Garamond's. Le Bé's son is known to have written to Plantin's successor Moretus offering to trade matrices so they could both have complementary type in a range of sizes. (Note: A large number of fragments of specimens of types from the Le Bé foundry survive at the Plantin-Moretus Museum, connected to this trade–extremely usefully for historians, as no complete Le Bé foundry specimen survives.) Konrad Berner showcased various types of Garamond's and other French engravers in a 1592 specimen, which named the types' engravers and would later be a source for historians. (Note: The 1592 Berner specimen, now in the Stadt- und Universitätsbibliothek, Frankfurt am Main, was misfiled for some years after the Second World War, and is therefore reported as believed lost in some post-war histories.)

Plantin's collection of original Garamond punches and matrices survives at the Plantin-Moretus Museum in Antwerp, together with many other typefaces collected by Plantin from other typefounders of the period. The collection has been used extensively for research, for example by historians Harry Carter and Vervliet. Plantin also commissioned punchcutter Robert Granjon to create alternate characters for three Garamond fonts with shortened ascenders and descenders to allow tighter linespacing.

Garamond's name was used outside France as a name for 10pt type, often in Dutch as 'Garmond'.

=== Robert Granjon ===
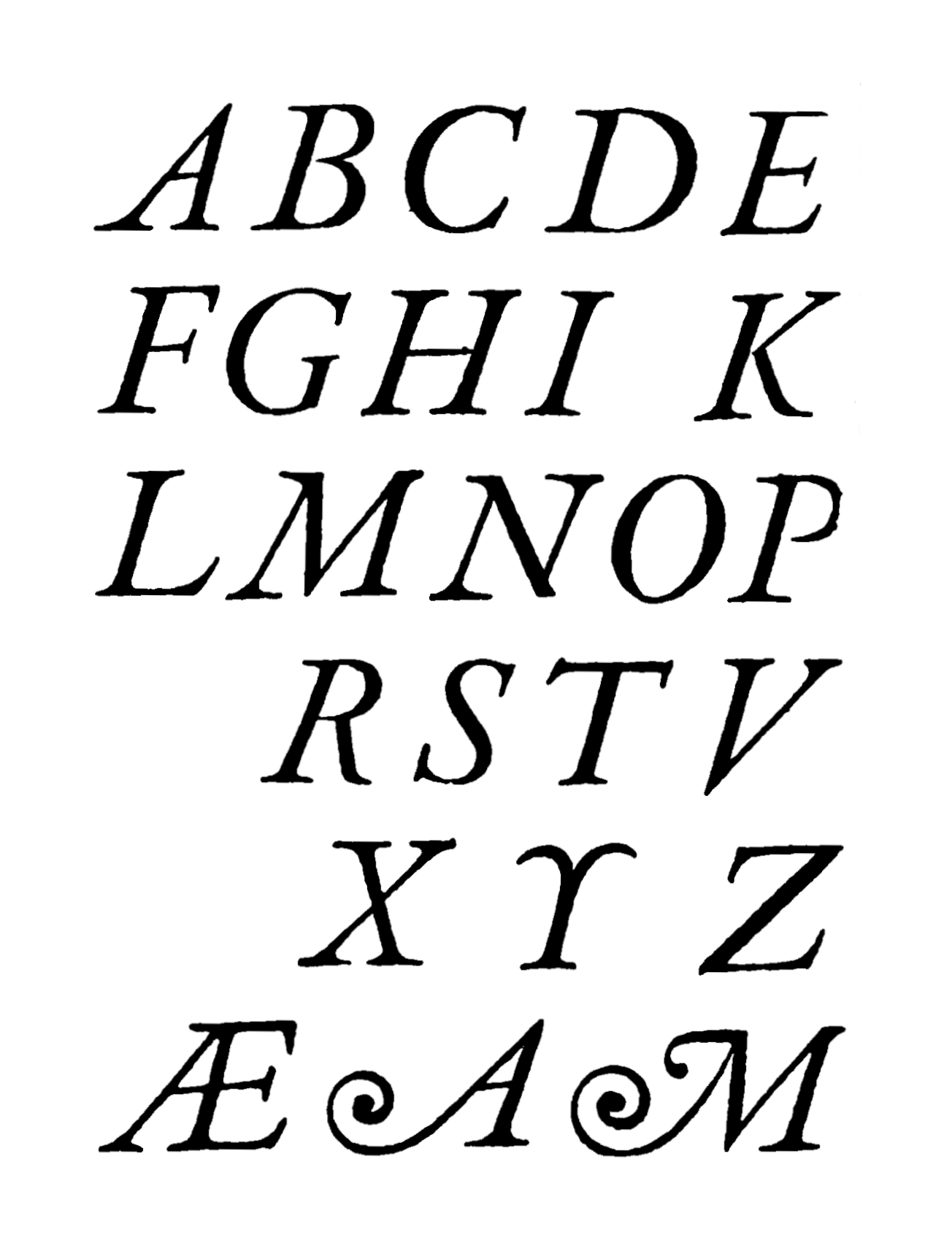
Italic capitals cut by Granjon, with additional swash 'A' and 'M'

Many modern revival fonts based on French renaissance printing are influenced by the work of Robert Granjon (c. 1513–90), particularly in italic. An engraver with a long and wide-ranging career, Granjon's work seems to have ranged much more widely than Garamond's focus on roman and Greek type, cutting type in italic, civilité (a cursive blackletter), and for the Vatican type in exotic alphabets including Arabic, Armenian and Hebrew. His career also took in stops in the Netherlands, Switzerland, Germany and finally for the last twelve years of his life Rome, where he ended his career in the service of the Vatican.

Vervliet comments that Granjon "laid the foundation for our image of the way an Italic should look." Although he was not quite the first designer to use the idea of italics having capitals sloped to complement the roman, he "solved successfully the problem of a balanced inclination of the capitals, a feature much ahead of the designs with a more irregular slope of his Viennese and Mainz predecessors...and even compared to...Garamont. A proper optical harmony of the angle of slope is characteristic for all Granjon’s Italics; it allowed the compositor to use whole lines of capitals without causing too much giddiness." Granjon also cut many swash capitals, which Vervliet describes as "deliciously daring" and have often been copied, for instance in Robert Slimbach's revivals for Adobe (discussed below).

=== Other French engravers of the sixteenth century ===
Besides Garamond, Granjon and the "Estienne master", other engravers were active in the French renaissance style.

Pierre Haultin particularly created many types which were very popular and distributed very widely around Europe: as a Protestant, he spent much of his career outside Paris working in Geneva, Lyon and La Rochelle and his nephew Jérôme established a career importing and casting his types in London, where his types were extremely common. In Carter's view Haultin "has been greatly underrated". Another engraver whose types were very popular in London was François Guyot, who moved from Paris to Antwerp and then London.

=== Jean Jannon ===
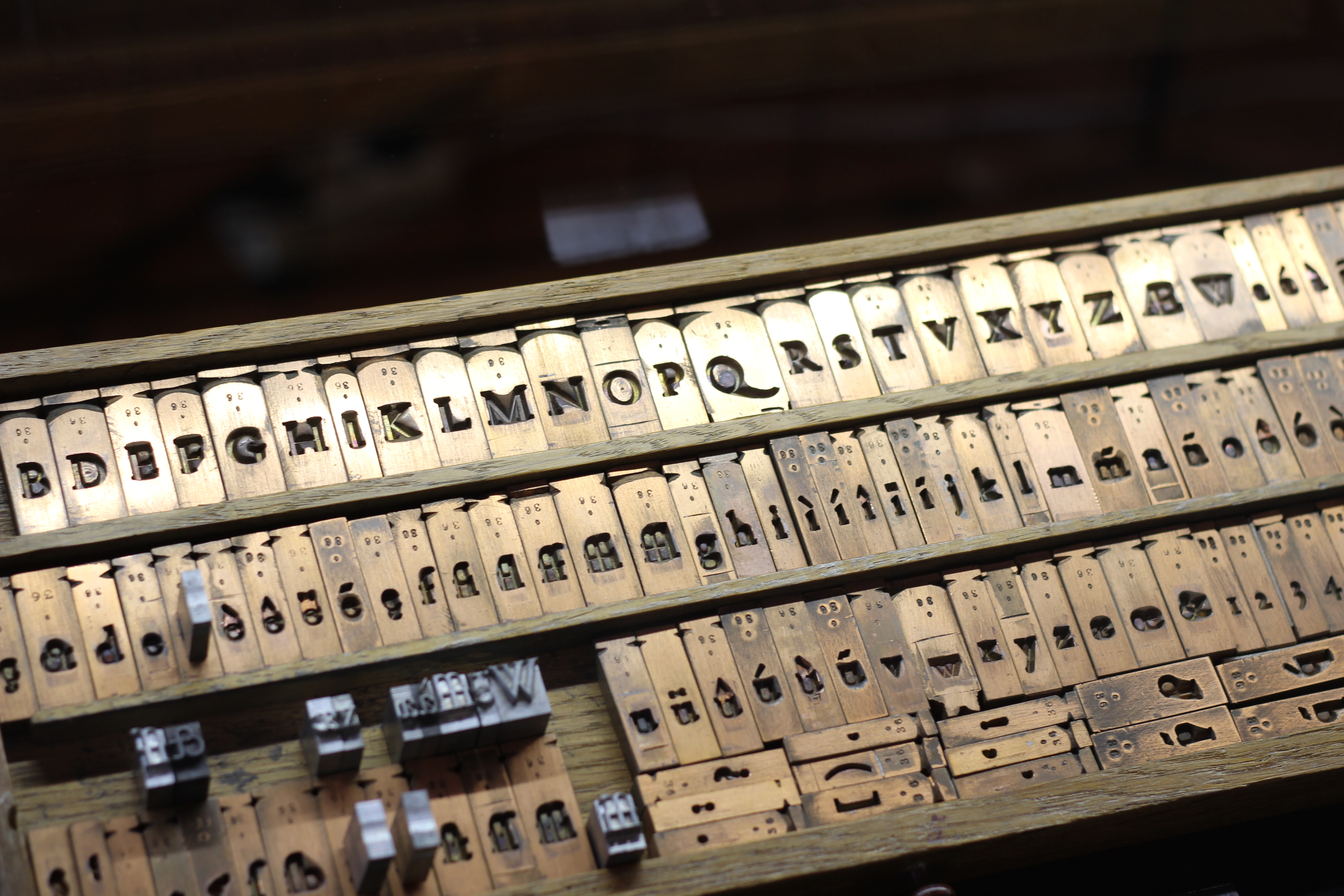
The matrices of Jannon's Imprimerie nationale type

In 1621, sixty years after Garamond's death, the French printer Jean Jannon released a specimen of typefaces in the Garamond/Granjon style. Jannon wrote in his specimen that:

Seeing that for some time many persons have had to do with the art [of printing] who have greatly lowered it ... the desire came upon me to try if I might imitate, after some fashion, some one among those who honourably busied themselves with the art, [men whose deaths] I hear regretted every day [Jannon mentions some eminent printers of the previous century] ... and inasmuch as I could not accomplish this design for lack of types which I needed ... [some typefounders] would not, and others could not furnish me with what I lacked [so] I resolved, about six years ago, to turn my hand in good earnest to the making of punches, matrices and moulds for all sorts of characters, for the accommodation both of the public and of myself.

Jannon was a Protestant in mostly Catholic France. After apparently working with the Estienne family in Paris he set up an independent career as printer in Sedan in what is now north-eastern France, becoming printer for the Protestant Academy. By his report he took up punchcutting seriously in his thirties, although according to Williamson he would have cut decorative material and engravings at least before this. Sedan at the time enjoyed an unstable independence as a principality at a time when the French government had conceded through the Edict of Nantes to allowing a complicated system of restricted liberties for Protestants.

The French Royal Printing Office (Imprimerie Royale) appears to have bought matrices from him in 1641 in three large sizes, roman and italic at roughly 18, 24 and 36 point sizes. (The contract is actually made for one 'Nicholas Jannon', which historians have concluded to be a mistake.) Despite the purchase, it is not clear that the office ever much used Jannon's type: historian James Mosley has reported being unable to find books printed by the Imprimerie that use more than two sizes of italic. (Note: Mosley did caution about the limits of what he could check: "it is not easy to prove a negative".) His type would later be misattributed to Garamond. Despite this, it is known that authorities in 1644 raided an office in Caen where he had been commissioned to do printing. Warde initially assumed that this was the source of the Jannon materials in the Imprimerie Nationale before the government's purchase order came to light. Jannon's types and their descendants are recognizable by the scooped-out triangular serifs on the top left of such characters as 'm', 'n' and 'r', which curve to a steeper slant in Jannon's design compared to Garamond's. The italics are also very different from Garamond's own or Granjon's, being much more ornate and with considerable variation in angle of the capitals. Opinions of Jannon's engraving quality have varied; Warde found them "so technically brilliant as to be decadent" and "of slight value as a book face" (the surviving Jannon sizes were intended as display faces, cut at 18pt or larger) and Vervliet described them as "famous not so much for the quality of the design but as for the long-term confusion it created", although many reproductions of his work were successful in printing in the twentieth century. Jannon cut far more types than those surviving in the Imprimerie collection: before the misattribution to Garamond, he was particularly respected for his engraving of an extremely small size of type, known for his workplace as sédanoise, which was popular.

By the nineteenth century, Jannon's matrices had come to be known as the Caractères de l'Université (Characters of the University). It has sometimes been claimed that this term was an official name designated for the Jannon type by Cardinal Richelieu, while Warde in 1926 more plausibly suggested it might be a garbled recollection of Jannon's work with the Sedan Academy, which operated much like a university despite not using the name. Carter in the 1970s followed this conclusion. Mosley, however, concludes that no report of the term (or much use of Jannon's matrices at all) exists before the nineteenth century, and it may originate from a generic term of the eighteenth century simply meaning older or more conservative typeface designs, perhaps those preferred in academic publishing.

=== The fate of Garamond's work ===
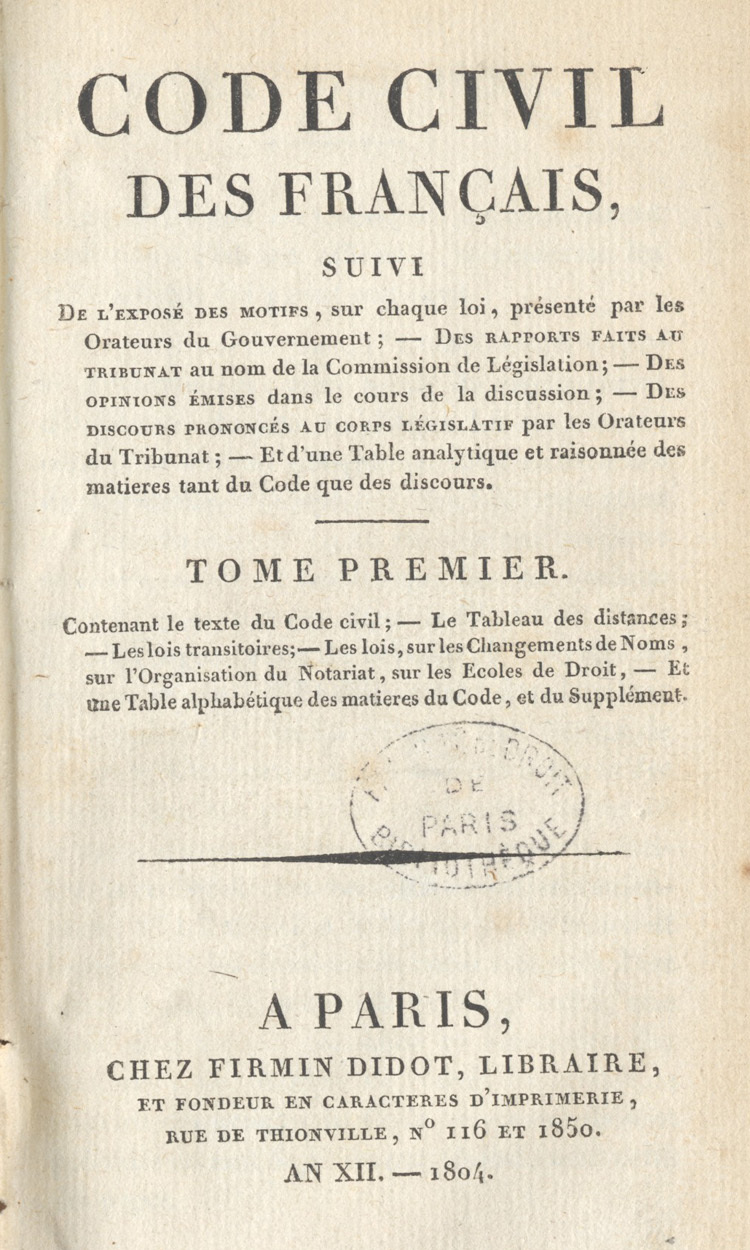
The Napoleonic Code, printed by the company of Firmin Didot in 1804. The Didot family's extremely influential type style, now called Didot, displaced the old-style serif type of Garamond, Jannon and others in the late eighteenth and early nineteenth centuries.

The old-style typefaces of Garamond and his contemporaries continued to be regularly used and kept in the stock of European typefounders until the end of the eighteenth century (Note: In some niche cases, such as a small Greek probably by Haultin, into the nineteenth.) and appear in the major French type foundry specimen books of the eighteenth century, of Delacolonge, Lamesle, and Gando. In Delacolonge's book, many fonts were shown "mutilated" or as "bastard" fonts: with replacement characters, specifically cut-down descenders to allow tighter linespacing. According to James Mosley French renaissance romans remained popular for slightly longer than italics, due to a taste for new italics, wider and with flat incoming serifs, introduced by the Romain du roi type and popularised by Simon-Pierre Fournier (see below): "it is common enough, in the second half of the eighteenth century, to find books set in a Garamond roman or a near copy mated with one of Fournier's italics".

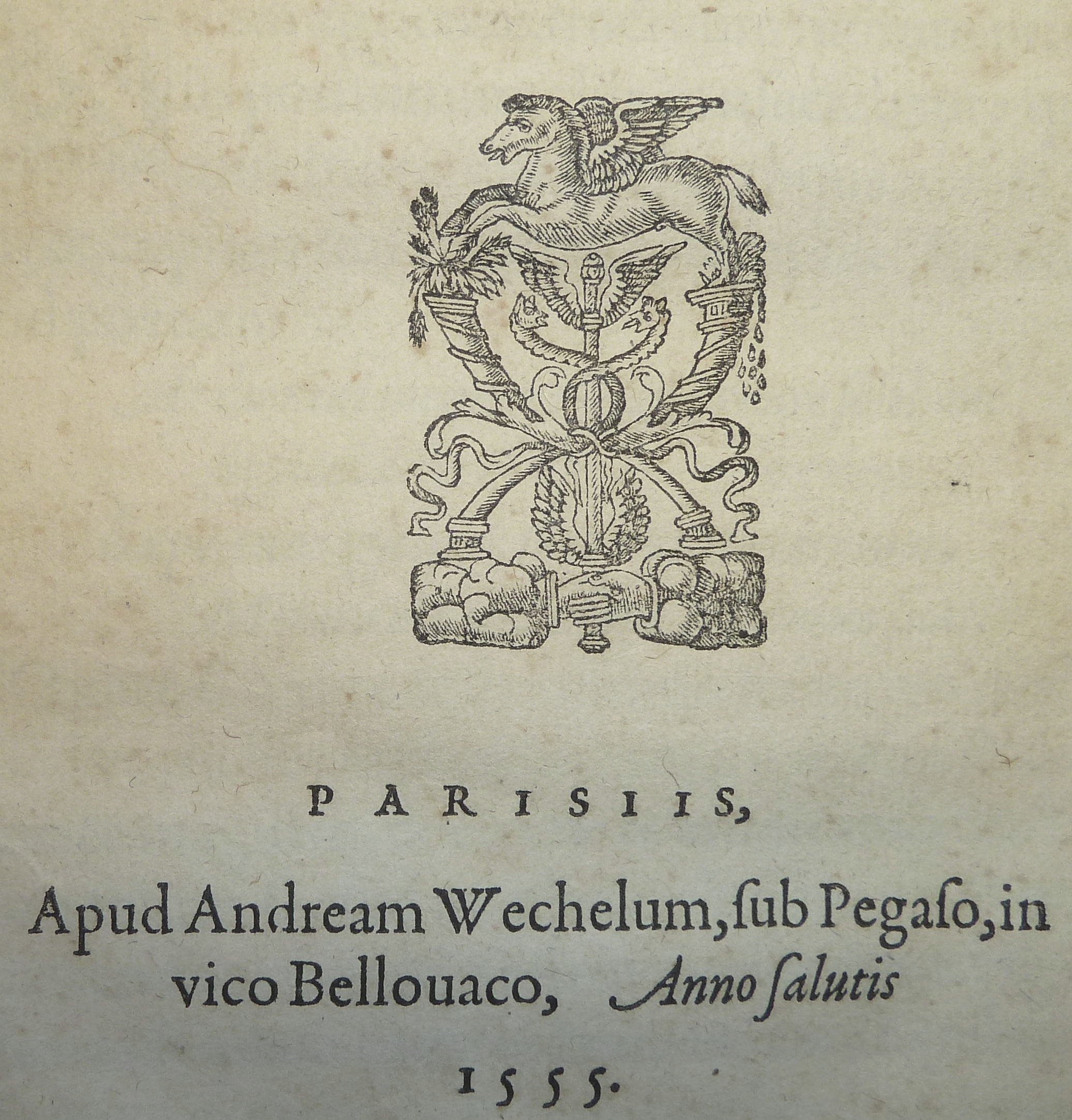
A rare French appearance of a 'W' in a 1555 book from printer Andreas Wechel, of German origins (Note: The crudeness of the 'W' compared to other capitals suggests that it might not have been part of the original font.)

A trademark associated with the Garalde style in modern times is the four-terminal 'W', although sixteenth-century French typefaces generally do not include the character as it is not normal in French. Many French renaissance typefaces used abroad had the character added later, along with the 'J' and 'U': these were often very visibly added by lesser craftsmen, producing an obvious mismatch. (Note: According to the showings cast by the Plantin-Moretus Museum of their Garamond faces intended to include no characters added later, none of their Garamond types include a 'J', capital 'U' or 'W' considered part of the original type.) Granjon added a 'W' and 'w', both with three upper terminals, to Garamond's Breviare roman in 1565 for Plantin.

The foundry of Guillaume Le Bé I which held many of Garamond's punches and matrices passed to Guillaume Le Bé II, and came to be managed by Jean-Claude Fournier, whose son Jean-Pierre in 1730 purchased it. (His younger brother, Simon-Pierre Fournier, rapidly left the family business and became a major exponent of modern ideas in printing, including standardised point sizes and crisp types influenced by contemporary calligraphy.)

In 1756, Jean-Pierre Fournier wrote of his collection of vintage equipment that "I am the owner of the foundry of Garamond, the Le Bé family and Granjon. I shall be happy to display my punches and matrices to all those who are lovers of true beauty ... these are the types that made the reputations of the Estiennes, Plantin and the Elzevirs," and referred to an inventory that he said was in his possession that had been drawn up after Garamond's death in 1561. (The comment was made in a journal during a public dispute with a printer of more modern tastes who preferred to remain anonymous and may have been his younger brother.) The 1561 inventory does not survive, although some later inventories do; by this point Fournier's foundry may have become rather inactive.

Old-style serif typefaces by Garamond and his contemporaries finally fell out of use altogether with the arrival of what is now called the Didone, or modern-face, style of printing in the eighteenth and early nineteenth centuries, promoted by the Didot family in France and others. This favoured a much more geometric, constructed style of letter which could show off the increasingly refined paper and printing technologies of the period. Lane suggests Fournier's type foundry may have finally disposed of its materials around 1805; in contrast, the collections of the Plantin-Moretus Museum survive almost intact. Mosley comments:

The upheavals of the Revolution coincided with the major shift in the style of printing types that is associated with the family of Didot, and the stock of old materials abruptly lost its value, except as scrap. Punches rust, and the copper of matrices is recyclable. All traces of the early types that had been in the hands of the trade typefounders like Le Bé, Sanlecque and Lamesle in Paris vanished completely. No relics of them were saved anywhere, except in commercial centres that had become relative backwaters, like Antwerp, where the Plantin-Moretus printing office piously preserved the collection of its founder ... the term caractères de l'Université became attached by default to the set of apparently early matrices that had survived, its provenance forgotten, in the mixed stock of materials of the national printing-office.

Garamond's reputation remained respected, even by members of the Didot family whose type designs came to dominate French printing.

=== Revival era ===
A revival of interest in 'old-style' serif typefaces took place in the late nineteenth and early twentieth century. This saw a revival of the Imprimerie royale typefaces (the office was now called the Imprimerie nationale following the end of the French monarchy), which, unlike Garamond's own work, had survived in Paris. The attribution came to be considered certain by the Imprimerie's director Arthur Christian, who commissioned the cutting of additional sizes in a matching style.

Early revivals were often based directly on the Imprimerie nationale types, one of the first by Peignot and then by American Type Founders (ATF). These revivals could be made using pantograph machine engraving systems, which gave a cleaner result than historic typefaces whose master punches had been hand-carved, and allowed rapid development of a family in a large range of sizes. In addition, the new hot metal typesetting technology of the period created increasing availability and demand for new fonts. Among hot metal typesetting companies, Monotype's branches in Britain and the United States brought out separate versions, and the American branch of Linotype licensed that of ATF.

A number of historians began in the early twentieth century to question if the Imprimerie nationale Latin-alphabet type was really the work of Garamond, as the Grecs du Roi undoubtedly were. Doubt was raised by French historian Jean Paillard, but he died during the First World War soon after publishing his conclusions in 1914 and his work remained little-read. ATF's historian Henry Lewis Bullen secretly doubted that the 'Garamond' his company was reviving was really Garamond's work, noting that he had never seen it in a sixteenth-century book. He discussed his concerns with ATF junior librarian Beatrice Warde, who would later move to Europe and become a prominent writer on printing advising the British branch of Monotype.

In a 1926 paper published on the British typography journal The Fleuron, Beatrice Warde revealed her discovery that the Imprimerie nationale type had been created by Jean Jannon, something she had discovered by examining printing credited to him in London and Paris and through reading the work of Paillard, and perhaps with advice from French bibliographer Marius Audin. (Note: Warde's article was originally published pseudonymously as the work of 'Paul Beaujon' in order to get more respect in a male-dominated industry; she said later that some readers were surprised to see an article supposedly by a Frenchman quoting The Hunting of the Snark.)

By the time Warde's article was published some revivals had been released that were more authentic revivals of Garamond's work, based on period books and printing specimens. The German company Stempel brought out a crisp revival of the original Garamond typefaces in the 1920s, inspired by a rediscovered specimen from the Egenolff-Berner foundry in Frankfurt, as did Linotype in Britain. (Note: Linotype's British version, Granjon, was an original creation. The American branch's version, Garamond No. 3, was licensed from American Type Founders, while there and in Germany Linotype also licensed and modified that of Stempel. These versions are discussed separately below under these names.)

== Timeline ==
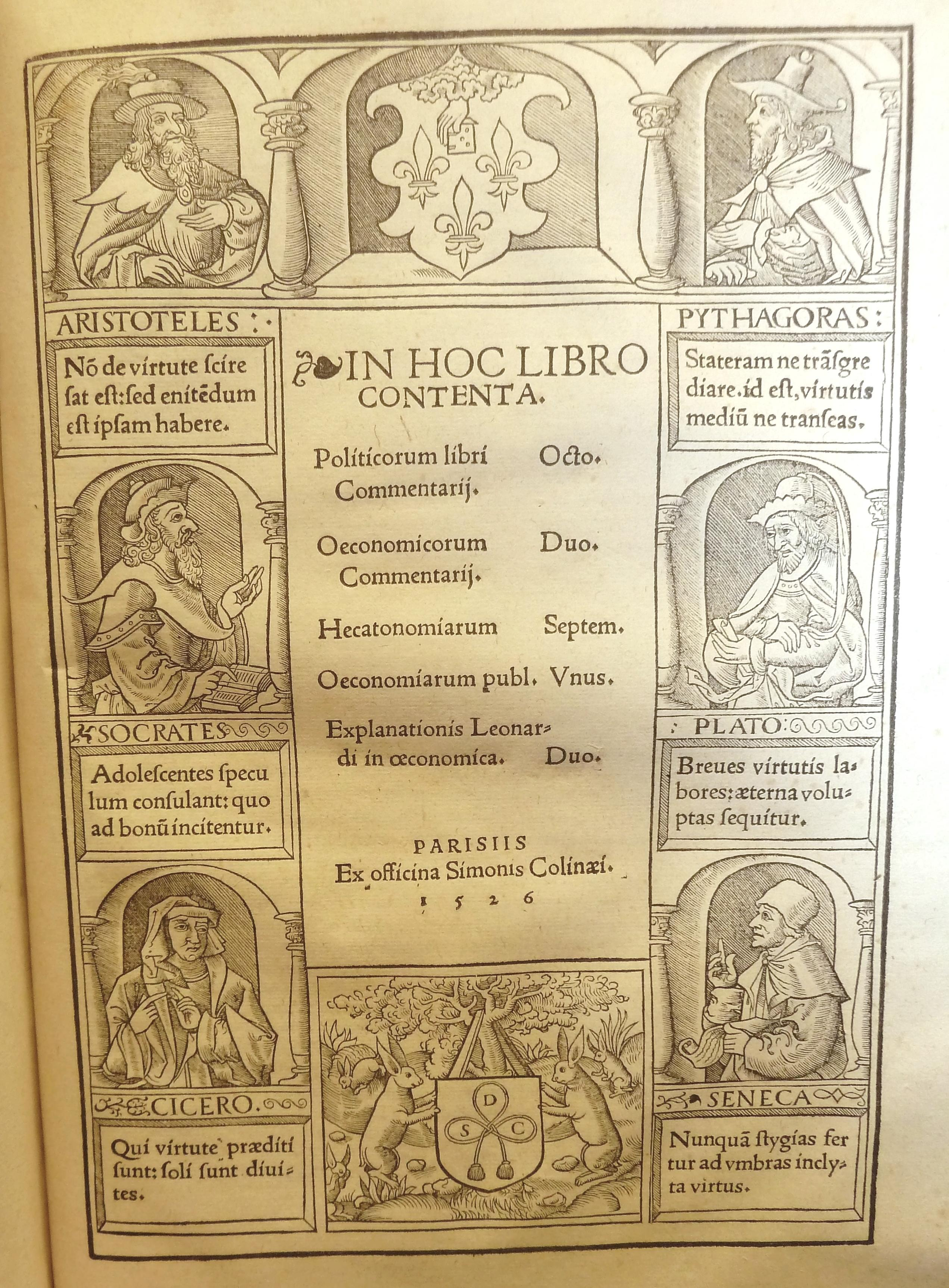
A woodcut title page printed by Simon de Colines, Robert Estienne's stepfather, in 1526. The font exemplifies the style preceding the 1530s: a font dark in colour, with wide capitals, tilted 'e's and large dots on the 'i', recalling calligraphy. De Colines, who probably engraved his own typefaces, developed his style and use of type over his lifetime, increasing the influence of classical Roman capitals and making his fonts more slender, particularly after the arrival of Estienne's types. A title page from two decades later shows his style later in life.

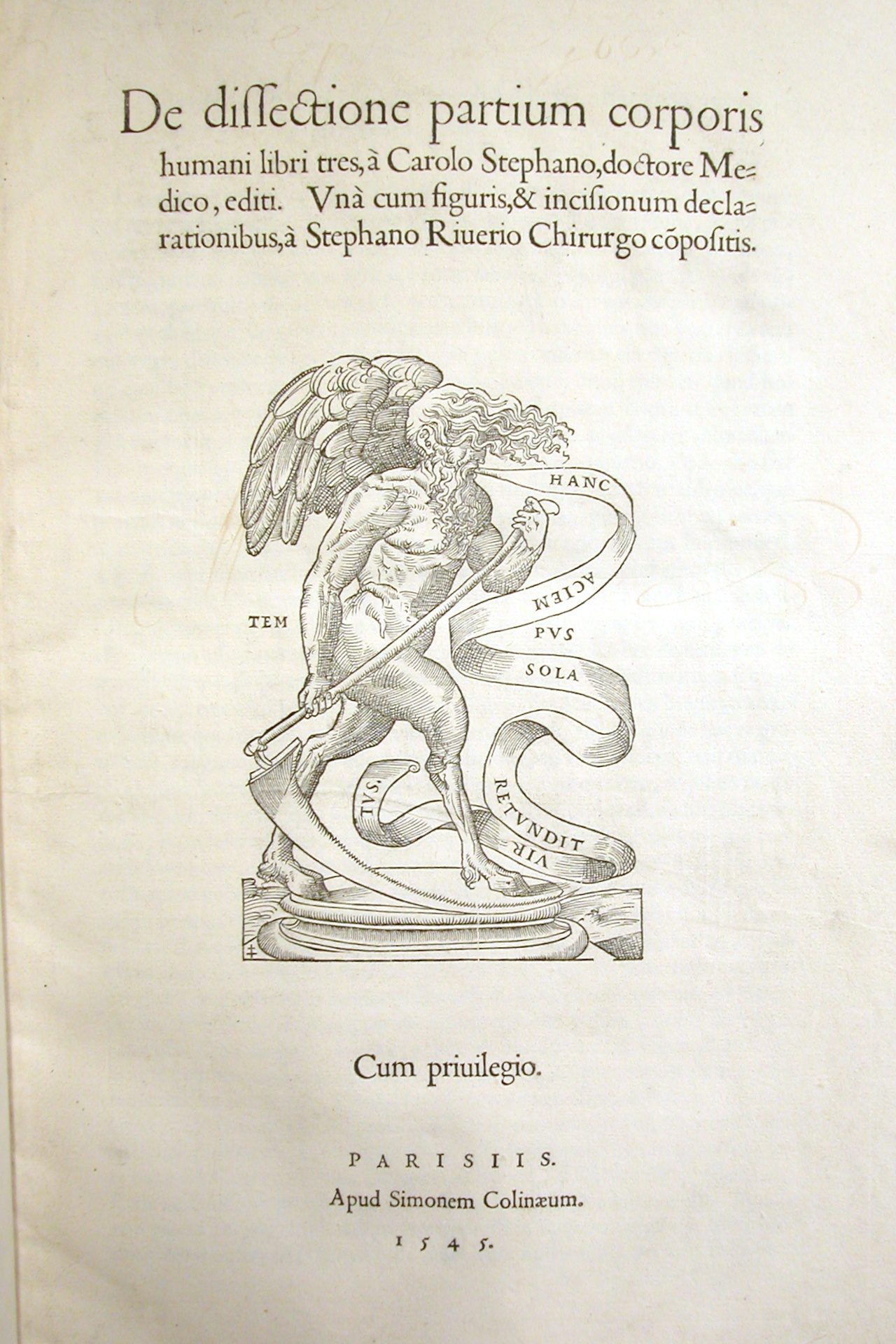

=== The Renaissance ===
- 1470 – first book printed in France, by a Swiss/German team at the Sorbonne, Paris. Early books printed in France generally use type of a blackletter design or roman type with blackletter characteristics.
- 1496 – Aldus Manutius publishes De Aetna, a short text of poetry that serves as his first printing in the Latin alphabet. Its roman type sets a standard that would later be imitated by French printers.

=== Late Renaissance ===
- 1510 – Garamond may have been born around this time.
- 1530 – Robert Estienne begins to publish in a new and more elegant style of 'roman' type, influenced by De Aetna with its asymmetrical 'M'.
- 1540 – Garamond first clearly enters the historical record, being advanced money to cut the Grecs du Roi type.
- 1561 – Death of Garamond.
- 1563 – Christophe Plantin buys matrices and other equipment in Paris at auction, some from Garamond's widow, for his partnership in Antwerp. Other equipment is bought by other Parisian and German printers; a specimen sheet identifying his types is issued by a Frankfurt foundry in 1592.
- 1560–70s – The work of Garamond and his contemporaries becomes very influential in the Low Countries and western Germany. A decline sets into the production of new typefaces, probably mostly due to simple saturation of the market with typefaces of acceptable quality, and possibly also due to economic and religious factors causing the emigration of printers and typefounders to other countries.

=== Early modern period ===
- 1580 – birth of Jannon
- 1621 – Jannon issues a specimen of his type.
- 1640 – Jannon leaves Sedan for Paris.
- 1641 – foundation of the Imprimerie Royale, which buys matrices from Jannon
- 1644 – Jannon's printing office in Caen is raided by authorities concerned that he may have been publishing banned material. Jannon is not imprisoned, but returns to Sedan.
- 1658 – death of Jannon

=== Eighteenth century ===
- 1756 – Parisian printer Jean-Pierre Fournier quotes from the 1561 inventory of Garamond's work and writes about his possession of Garamond's equipment. However, his extensive collections are dispersed after his death in 1783 and ultimately 'traditional' old-style type falls out of use in France around the end of the century.

=== Early revival era ===
- Late nineteenth century – revival in interest in 'old-style' typefaces such as the Caslon type (1730s, England) and that of Jenson (1470s, Venice).
- 1912 – revival of the Imprimerie Royale (now Imprimerie nationale, following the revolution) type by the Peignot foundry. A revival by Ollière of "Garamond" type based on photographing sixteenth-century books follows
- 1914 – Jean Paillard writes and Ollière publishes an essay showcasing Ollière's Garamond revival arguing that the Imprimerie nationale type was not created by Garamond but his work attracts little attention. He is killed serving in the First World War a few months later.
- 1920 – a copy of the 1592 Berner specimen of typefaces is published in facsimile.
- 1923 – ATF issues a specimen of their Garamond revival, in development for several years prior. ATF's historian Henry Bullen privately tells Beatrice Warde, then a junior librarian, that he suspects that Garamond had nothing to do with the type, since he had never seen it in a contemporary book, but has no better candidate for its creator. Warde subsequently moves to Europe, becoming a freelance writer on printing and adviser to Monotype in London.
- 1925 – Based on the Egelhoff-Berner specimen, Stempel Garamond is released in Germany: later also released by Linotype, it is the first Garamond revival actually based on his work.
- 1923 – Monotype Garamond is published based on the Imprimerie nationale type.
- 1926 – Warde discovers and reveals that the Imprimerie nationale type was created by Jannon, and that all revivals based on it are not directly based on Garamond's work.

== Contemporary versions ==
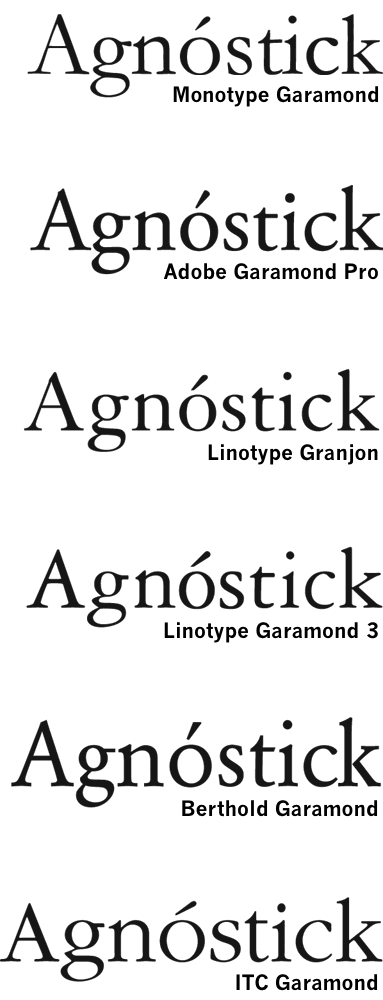
Various modern revival typefaces using the name 'Garamond'. The topmost sample (Monotype Garamond), as well as those for Garamond 3 and ITC Garamond, are actually based on the work of Jean Jannon – note the steep, scooped-out serif of 'n'.

=== Based on Garamond's design ===
==== Stempel Garamond ====
A 1920s adaptation created by the Stempel Type Foundry and released for hot metal typesetting by Linotype, that has remained popular. Its lower case 'a' has a sharp and somewhat angular look with a crisp hook at the top left, in contrast to a teardrop design that is common in many other serif typefaces. Stempel Garamond has relatively short descenders, allowing it to be particularly tightly linespaced. An unusual feature is the digit 0, which has reversed contrast, with the thickest points of the number on the top and bottom of the digit to make it more distinguishable from an 'o'. The Klingspor Museum credits it to Stempel's head of typeface development Dr. Rudolf Wolf.

Garamond No. 1 and Garamond No. 2 are both based on Stempel Garamond, with various differences. Another typeface known as Original Garamond is a clone of Stempel Garamond.

===== URW++ Garamond No. 8 =====
Garamond No. 8 is a freeware version of Stempel Garamond contributed by URW++ to the Ghostscript project; it was included in GhostScript since Stempel Garamond is included as a system font in some implementations of the PostScript standard. It is distributed under the AFP license, which allows it to be copied freely but not sold. It is understood that its license does not place any restriction on whether the typeface is used in commercial settings (as long as the typeface is not distributed in situations where a fee is involved), nor whether printed contents created with it are sold. Garamond No. 8 hence does not have a fully open-source license, but its license does not restrict usage for personal purposes or commercial printing.

Featuring a bold weight, small capitals, optional text figures and automatic ligature insertion, it is particularly popular in the TeX community and is also included on some Linux distributions. Originally released as a PostScript Type 1, it has been converted into the TrueType format, usable by most current software.

Garamond No. 8 is often packaged as "urw-garamond" in the open source communities, but is actually different from another typeface that is simply known as URW Garamond.

==== Granjon ====
Granjon was a 1920s revival designed by George W. Jones for the British branch of Linotype, using a 1582 history textbook as a model and also influenced by Caslon. It was the favourite Garalde of many in the twentieth century, including Warde and Walter Tracy.

Jones also created for Linotype Estienne, a delicate revival based on Robert Estienne's fonts of the 1530s discussed above, with very long ascenders and descenders. It was less popular and as of 2017 it has not been officially digitised by Linotype. Williamson suggested that in body text it failed to adapt the style of a large letter effectively down to body text size, giving a design with an extremely small x-height.

==== Sabon ====
Sabon is a Garamond revival designed by Jan Tschichold in 1964, jointly released by Linotype, Monotype and Stempel in 1967. It is named after Jacques Sabon, a Frankfurt-based printer, who introduced the typefaces of Garamond and his contemporaries to German printing. An unusual feature of many releases of Sabon is that the italic, based on Granjon's work, is wider than most normal italics, at the same width as the roman style. This suited Linotype's hot metal typesetting system. Later Sabon versions, such as Jean François Porchez's Sabon Next, have not always maintained this principle.

Tschichold stated that Sabon was designed based on the Egenolff-Berner specimen, although there are different accounts on whether it was drawn using the Saint Augusin (around 13pt) or the Parangon (around 18.5pt) models. Porchez and Christopher Burke later researched into Sabon during the development of Sabon Next. They suggested that aspects of Sabon's design may have been copied from a type by Guillaume Le Bé, a large-size specimen of which he had Tschichold reproduced in a textbook. Sabon Next was based on the version of Sabon that was developed for the Stempel metal handsetting system, along with designs of other Garamond types.

==== Berthold Garamond ====
A 1972 revival for phototypesetting issued by H. Berthold and designed by Günter Gerhard Lange.

URW Garamond (which is different from URW Garamond No. 8 mentioned above, despite the latter often being packaged as "urw-garamond" in open source software) is a clone of Berthold Garamond.

==== Adobe Garamond ====
Released in 1989, Adobe Garamond was designed by Robert Slimbach for Adobe Systems following a research visit to the Plantin-Moretus Museum, based on a Roman type by Garamond and an italic type by Robert Granjon. The font family has three weights (regular, semibold, and bold), each with its respective italic, totalling six styles. Its quite even, mature design attracted attention on release for its authenticity, in contrast to the much more aggressive ITC Garamond popular at the time. (Note: A remastering in the modern OpenType font format was released in 2000 as Adobe Garamond Pro.) It is one of the most popular versions of Garamond in books and fine printing. Slimbach decided not to base the design directly on Garamond types in the 9–15pt sizes normally used for book text, but on a larger type called parangonne or vraye parangonne, which he felt was Garamond's "most attractive work". It was reviewed by Hugh Williamson for the Printing Historical Society as "well-suited to photocomposition and to offset printing". It also received two detailed reviews in the same issue of Printing History, both a favourable one by Jery Kelly and a more critical one by book designer Mark Argetsinger. Argetsinger felt that while the parangonne type was "a very beautiful design", the choice to base a text type on it produced a type of "relative pallidness" when printed by lithography. He recommended that Adobe add more optical sizes.

==== Garamond Premier ====
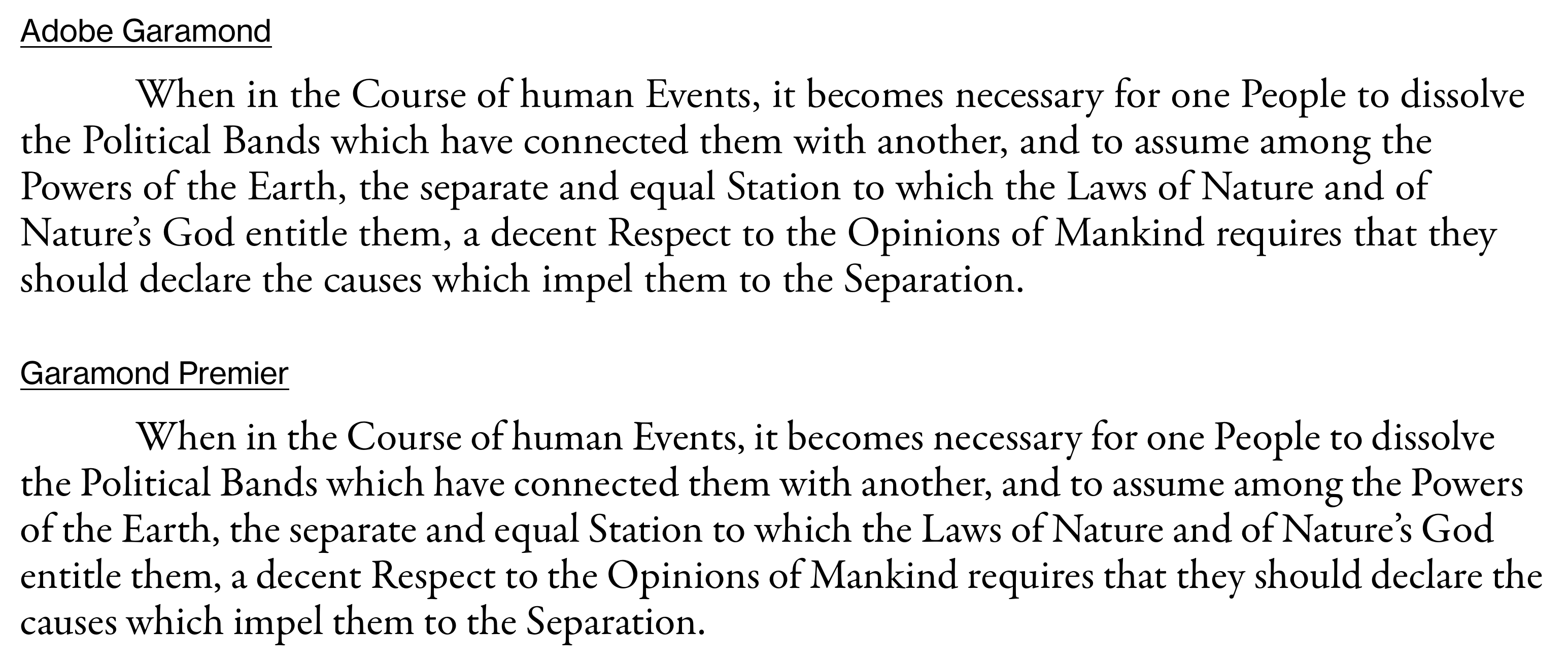
Comparison between Adobe Garamond and Garamond Premier, both of which are set in the same font sizes (and also the same x-heights in this case).

During the production of Adobe Garamond, its designer Robert Slimbach started planning for a second interpretation of Garamond after visiting the Plantin-Moretus Museum in 1988. He concluded that a digital revival of Garamond's work would not be definitive unless it offered optical sizes, with different fonts designed for different sizes of text. Unable to create such a large range of styles practically with the technology and business requirements of the 1980s, he completed the project in 2005. Adobe states that Garamond Premier was developed based on multiple specimens at the Plantin-Moretus Museum.

Garamond Premier has 4 optical sizes (Regular, Caption, Subhead, and Display) and at least 4 weights (Regular, Medium, Semibold, and Bold, with an additional Light weight for Display), each with its respective italic, totalling 34 styles in the OpenType font format. Garamond Premier and its predecessor Adobe Garamond have the same x-heights, but they have many subtle differences in their designs. At the same weights and x-heights (hence font sizes), Garamond Premier is slightly darker and has tighter spacing than Adobe Garamond. Some other notable differences include (but are not limited to) the designs of the lowercase "t", lowercase "r", and uppercase "Q".

It features glyph coverage for Central European, Cyrillic and Greek characters including polytonics. Professor Gerry Leonidas, an expert in Greek-language printing, described it in 2005 as "bar none, the most accomplished typeface you can get for complex Greek texts". Adobe executive Thomas Phinney characterized Garamond Premier as a "more directly authentic revival" than their earlier Garamond, which he described as "a more restrained and modernized interpretation".

==== EB Garamond ====
The EB Garamond («Egenolff-Berner-Garamond») is a free and open-source software implementation of Garamond, released by Georg Duffner in 2011 under the Open Font License. Duffner based the design on the 1592 Berner specimen, with italic and Greek characters based on Robert Granjon's work, as well as the addition of Cyrillic characters and OpenType features such as swash italic capitals and schoolbook alternates. As of 2014, it was intended to include multiple optical sizes, including fonts based on the 8 and 12 point sizes. It has been described as "one of the best open source fonts" by prominent typeface designer Erik Spiekermann. As Georg Duffner was unable to complete the bold weights for personal reasons, the project was continued by Octavio Pardo. (Note: As of 2018, this implementation has 5 weights (Regular, Medium, Semi-Bold, Bold and Extra-Bold), both in regular and italic style. The font files in both common flavours (OTF and TTF) can be downloaded from Pardo's repository and are also available for embedding on Google Fonts, but in an, according to Duffner, ”utterly outdated” version.)

==== Berylium ====
Berylium is an implementation of Garamond designed by Ray Larabie for printed body text, with purposely jagged edges. Larabie released Berylium into the public domain in 2024.

==== WT Garamono ====
Garamono, a monospaced interpretation of Garamond designed by Ishar Hawkins, was released on WiseType in 2025. It draws its inspiration from the 1592 Berner specimen.

=== Based on Jannon's design ===
==== ATF Garamond/Garamond No. 3 ====
American Type Founders created a revival of the Imprimerie Nationale fonts from around 1917, which was designed in-house by its design department led by Morris Fuller Benton under the influence of its historian and advisor Henry Lewis Bullen. It received a sumptuous showing, marketed especially towards advertisers, in ATF's 1923 specimen book. Also involved in the design's development was book and advertising designer T.M. Cleland, who created a set of matching borders and ornaments and according to Warde and Garnett also advised on the design and designed the swash characters. (Note: Porter Garnett, in his 1927 showcase and account of running the Carnegie Institute of Technology printing course in the 1920s (which is set in ATF Garamond), provides a contemporary commentary on its genesis: "Garamond (made available to American printers in 1920) was designed by Mr. Morris F. Benton, after the caractères de l'Université attributed to the sixteenth century punch-cutter Claude Garamond (or Garamont). It has remained for Mrs. Beatrice Becker Warde ("Paul Beaujon") to prove [their origin] to Jean Jannon, of Sedan… The forms of certain letters of the roman font, as first issued by the American Type Founders Company, were, upon the suggestion of Mr. T.M. Cleland, subsequently modified. The E, F and L were made more narrow, the J longer, the U wider, and the lower termination of the & altered. Mr. Cleland also designed a series of swash letters for the italic. The numerals originally issued with the font were of the highly objectionable "ranging" variety, but my solicitations (after two years of…using wrong-font sorts in their stead) finally extracted non-ranging numerals from the founders. I induced them also to make three ligatures Qu, Qu and Qu [with a Caslon-style calligraphic 'Q'], and a k and z [with descending flourishes similar to those on Monotype Garamond], which were used for the first time in "That Endeth Never".)

While ATF's handset foundry type release was initially popular, the design became particularly known to later users under the name of "Garamond No. 3”, as a hot metal adaptation that was licensed to Linotype's American branch and sold from around 1936. More practical to use than ATF's handset foundry type, the number distinguished it from two versions of Stempel Garamond which Linotype also sold. It was the preferred Garalde font of prominent designer Massimo Vignelli.

Several digitisations have been made of both ATF's Garamond and the Linotype adaptation, most notably a 2015 digitisation by van Bronkhorst with optical sizes and the original swash characters. A loose adaptation with sans-serif companion by Christian Schwartz is the corporate font of Deutsche Bahn.

===== Gallery =====
Images from American Type Founders' 1923 specimen book.

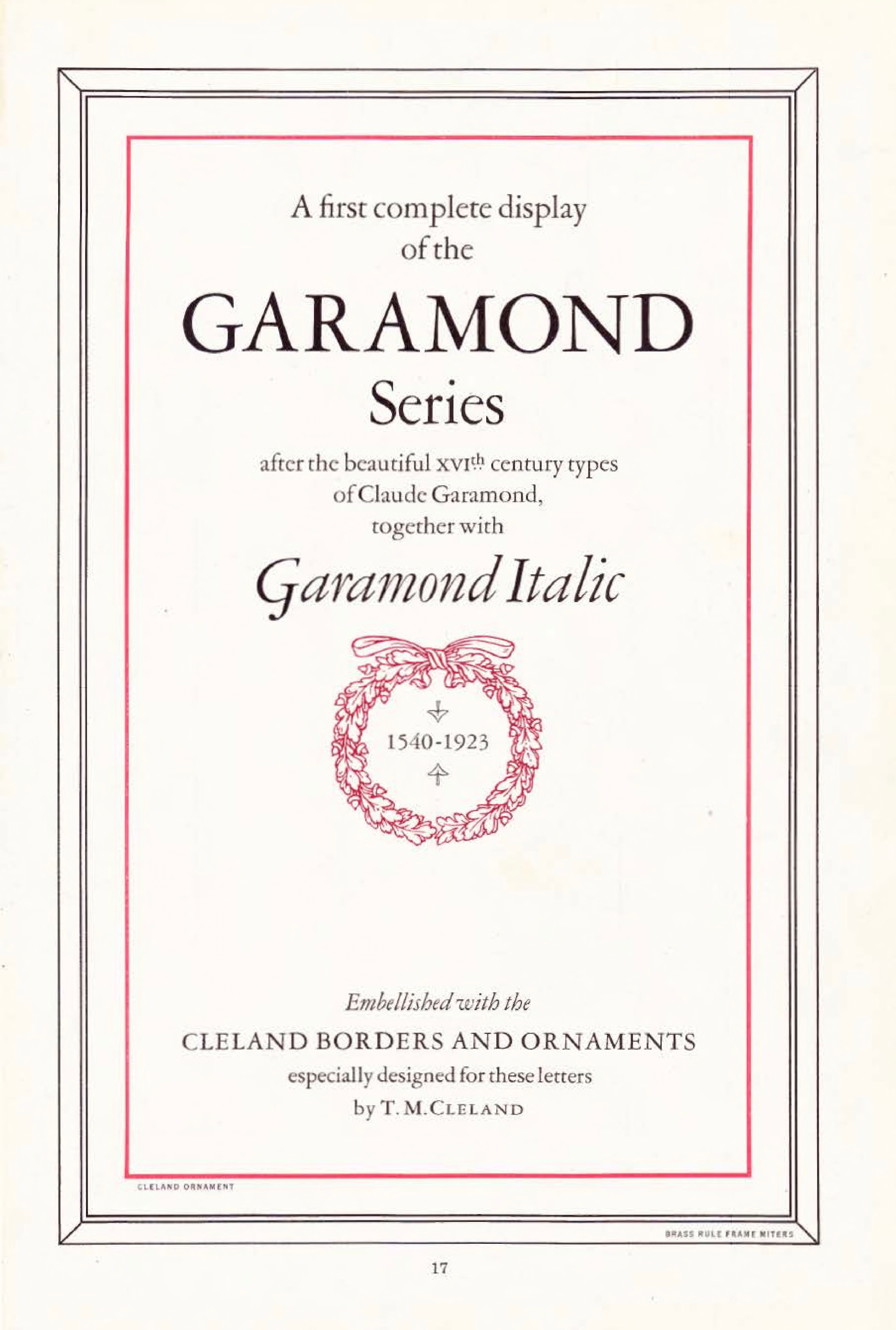

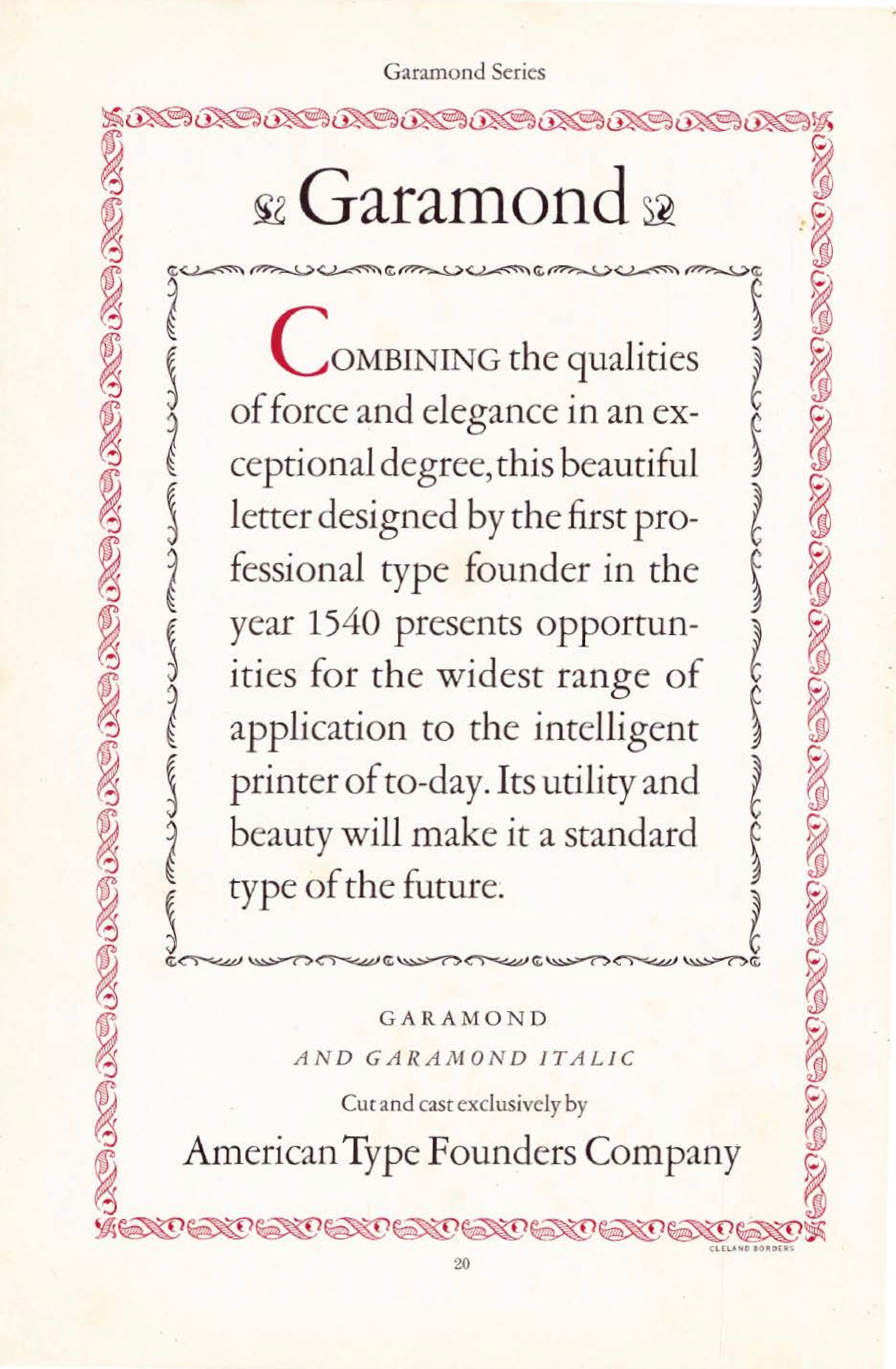

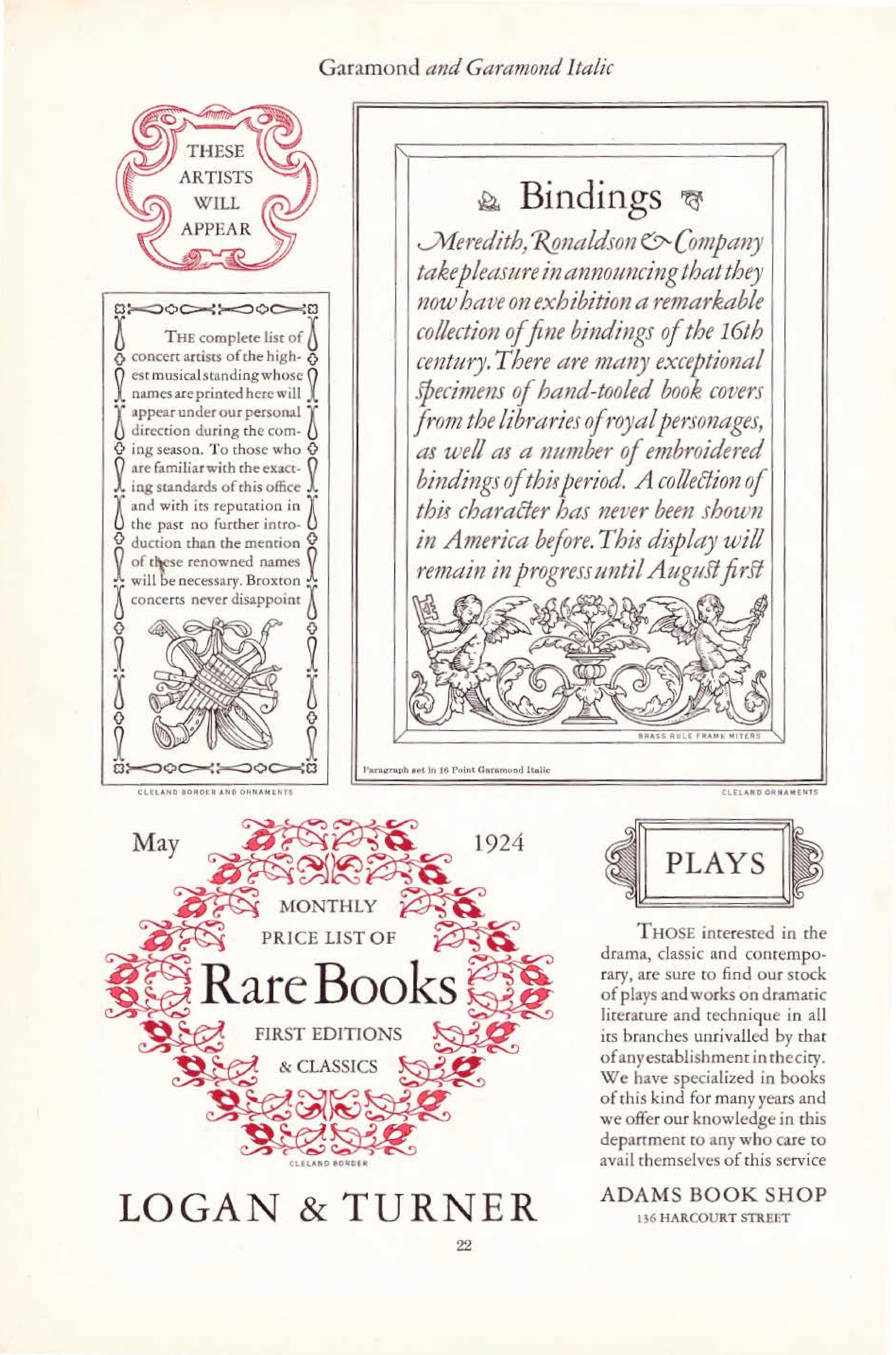

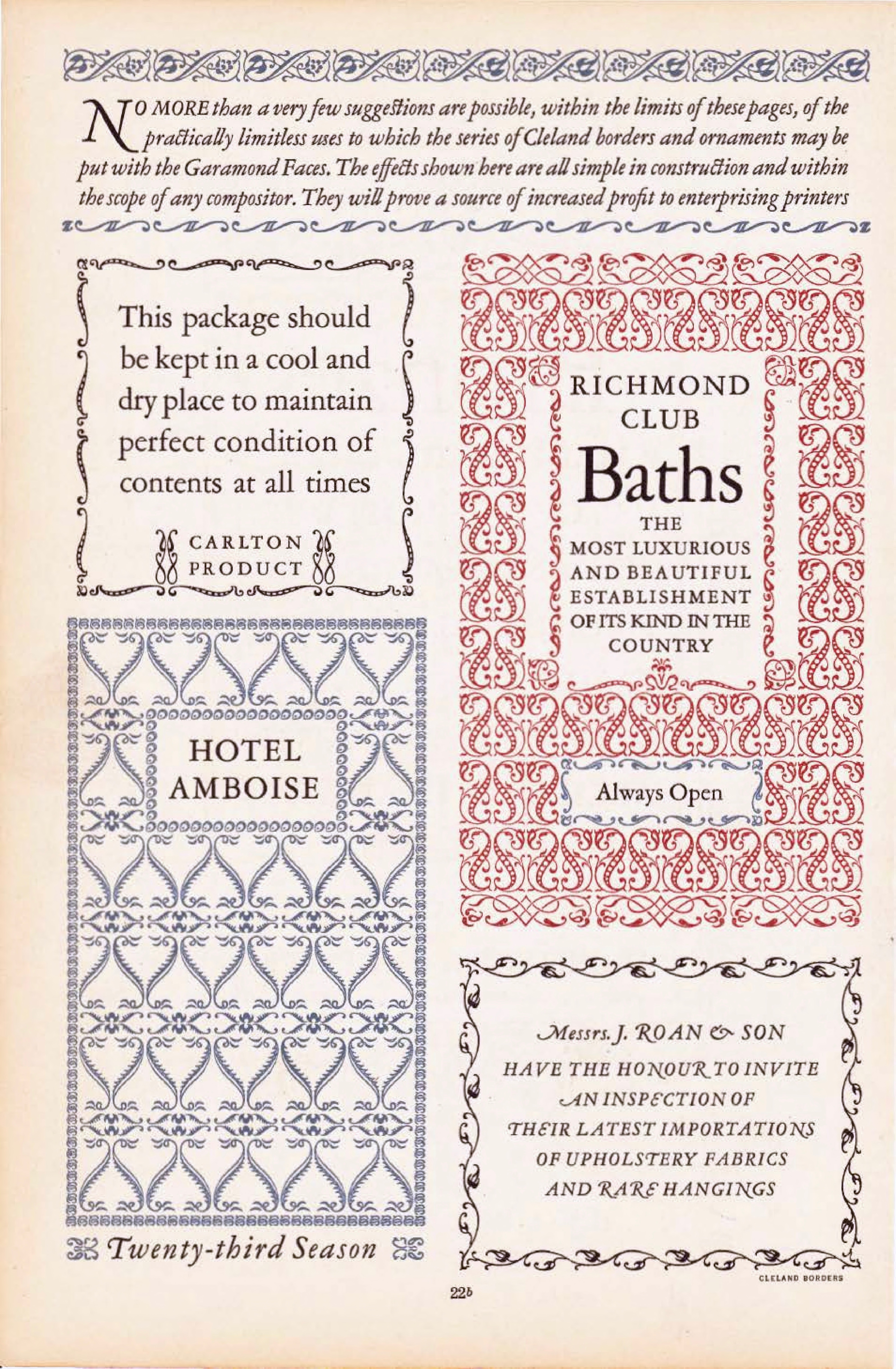

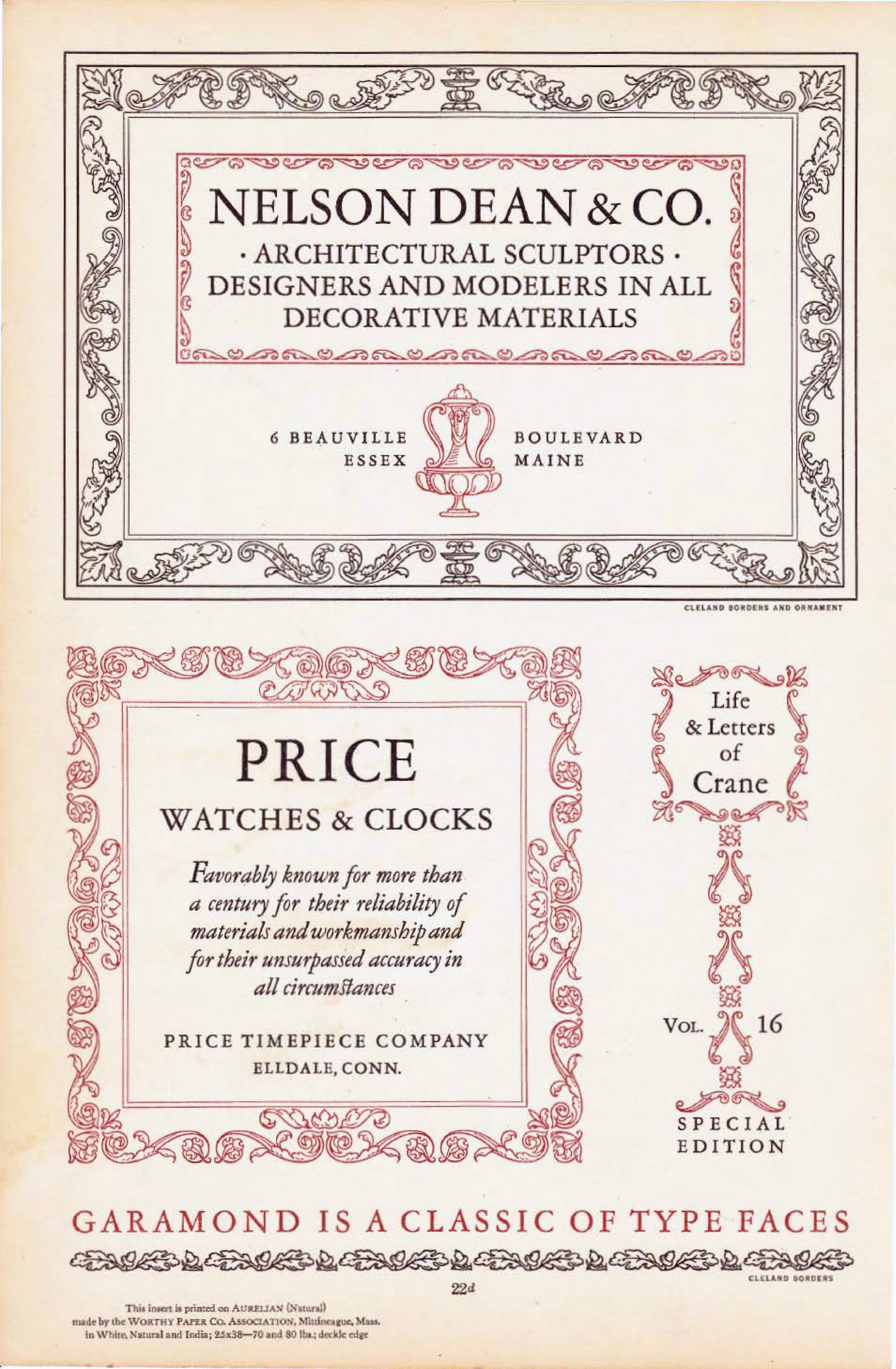

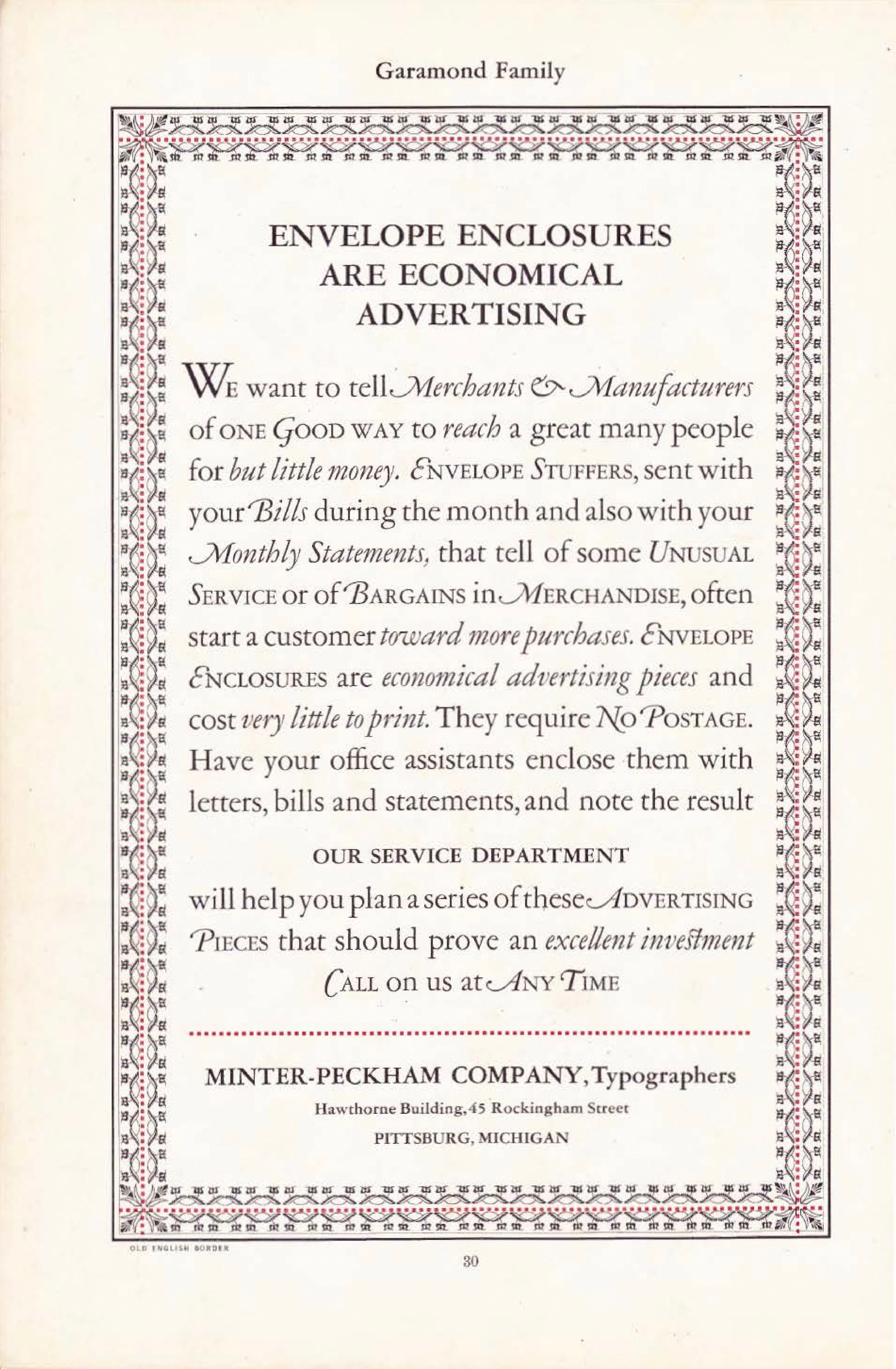

==== Monotype Garamond ====
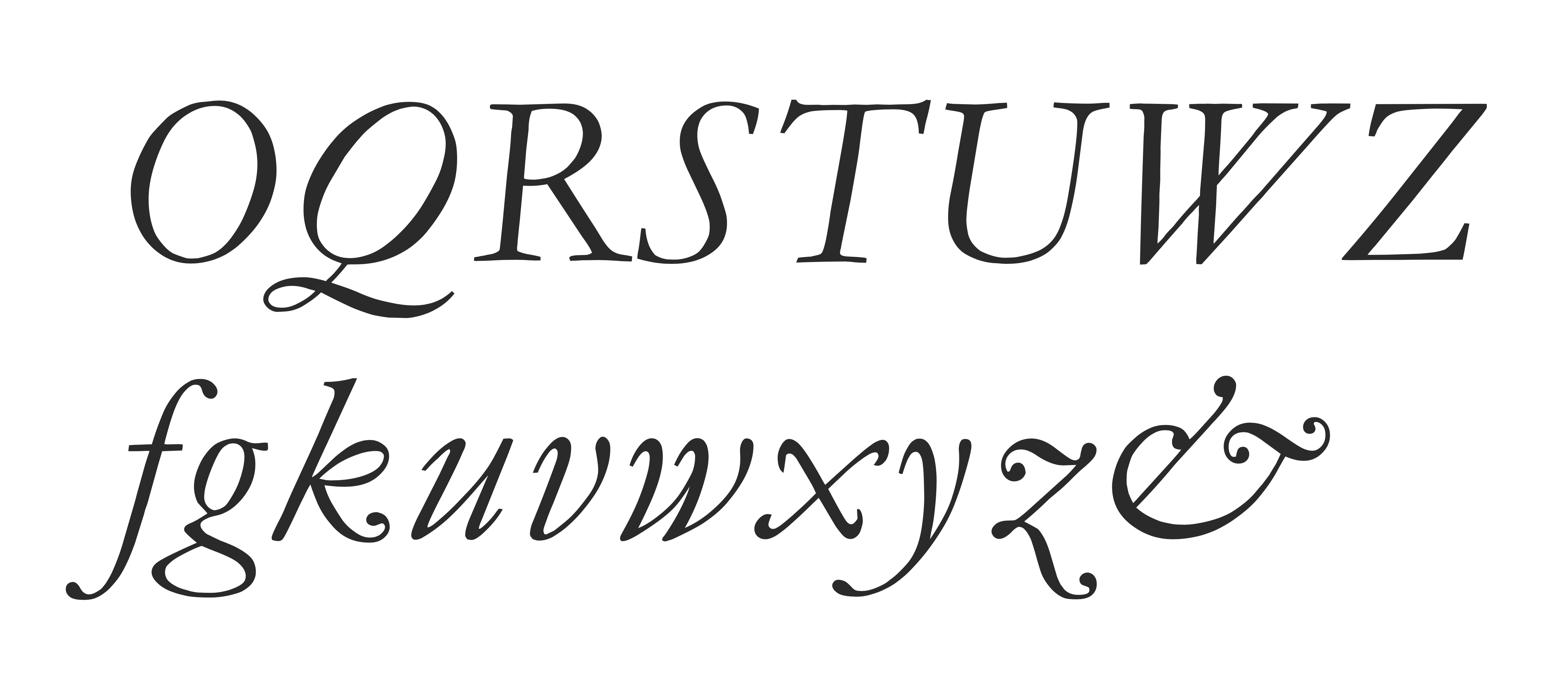
Monotype Garamond's italic replicates the work of punchcutter Jean Jannon quite faithfully, with a variable slant on the capitals and swashes on many lower-case letters. (Note: An accessible comparison is Warde, p. 166.)

Monotype's 1922–1923 design, based on Jannon's work in the Imprimerie Nationale, is bundled with Microsoft Office. Its italic, faithful to Jannon's, is extremely calligraphic, with a variable angle of slant and flourishes on several lower-case letters. Its commercial release is more extensive than the basic Microsoft release, including additional features such as swash capitals and small capitals, although like many pre-digital fonts these are only included in the regular weight. Popular in the metal type era, its digitisation has been criticised for having too light a colour on the page for body text if printed with many common printing systems, a problem with several Monotype digitisations of the period. Monotype's 1933 guide to identifying their typefaces noted the asymmetrical T, the sharp triangular serif at top left of m, n, p and r, and a q unlike the p, with a point at top right rather than a full serif.

Monotype's artistic advisor Stanley Morison wrote in his memoir that the italic was based on Granjon's work, but as Carter's commentary on it notes, this seems generally to be a mistake. The swash capitals, however, at least, probably are based on the work of Granjon. A 1959 publicity design promoting it was created by a young Rodney Peppé.

==== Garamont ====
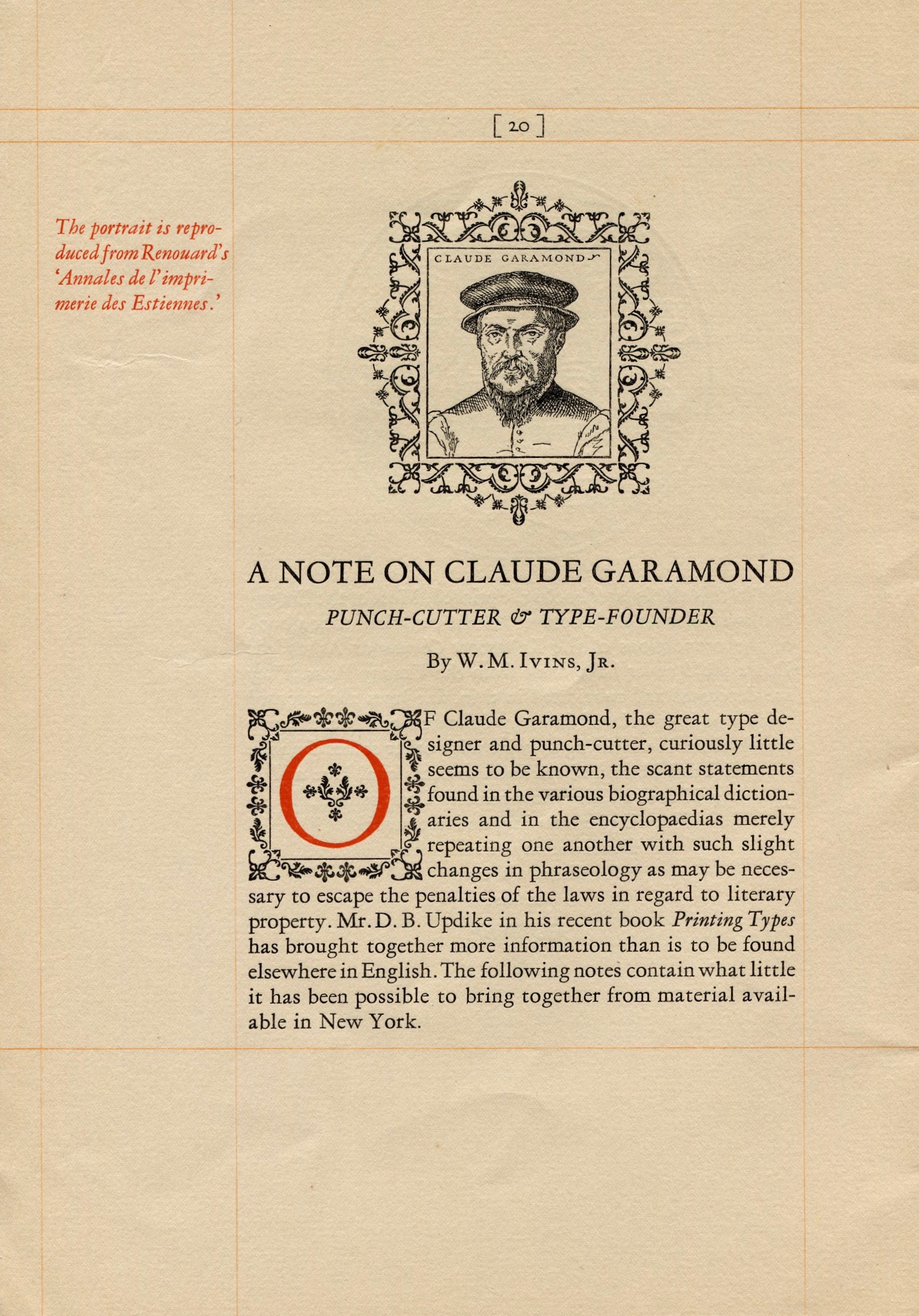
Sample of Monotype Garamont by Goudy, showcased in its magazine in 1923

A revival by Frederic Goudy for the American branch of Monotype, the name chosen to differ from other revivals. An elegant sample created by Bruce Rogers was shown in a spring 1923 issue of Monotype's magazine. It, like Monotype Garamond, features a large range of swash characters, based on Imprimerie Nationale specimen sheets.

Mosley has described it as "a lively type, underappreciated I think." LTC's digitisation deliberately maintained its eccentricity and irregularity true to period printing, avoiding perfect verticals. In 1923, Morison at the British branch of Monotype thought it somewhat florid in comparison to the version of his branch which he considered a personal project, noting in a 1923 letter to American printer Daniel Berkeley Updike that "I entertain very decided opinions about this latest of Mr. Goudy's achievements ... a comparison leaves me with a preference for our version."

==== Simoncini Garamond ====
A 1950s version following Jannon by the Simoncini company of Italy, owned by Francesco Simoncini, which sold matrices for Linotype machines. It is particularly popular in Italian printing.

==== Jannon ====
František Štorm's 2010 revival with optical sizes is one of the few modern revivals of Jannon's work. Štorm also created a matching sans-serif companion design, Jannon Sans.

=== Related fonts ===
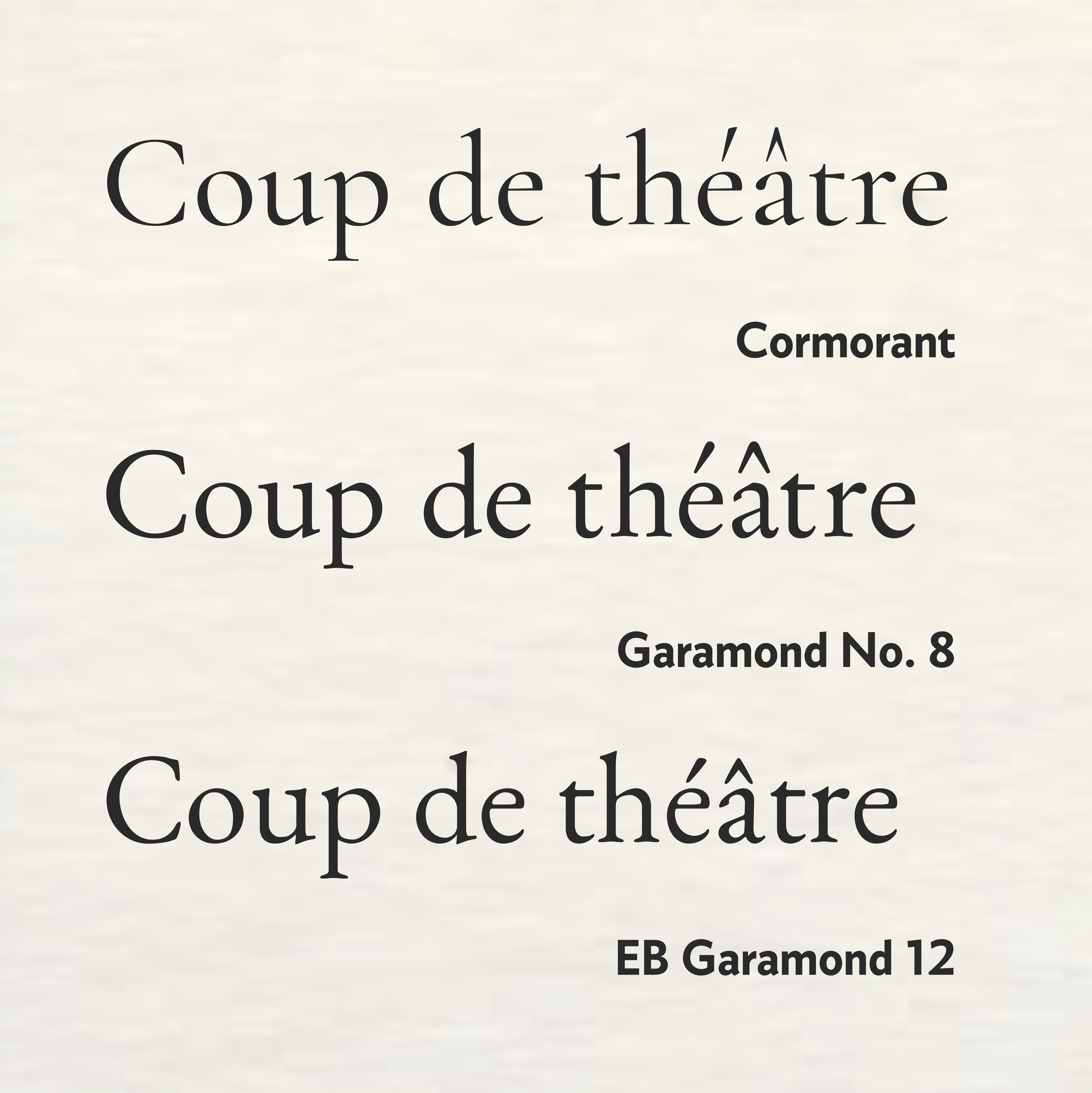
Three freely available Garamond revivals

As one of the most popular typefaces in history, a number of designs have been created that are influenced by Garamond's design but follow different design paths.

==== ITC Garamond ====
ITC Garamond was created by Tony Stan in 1975, and follows ITC's house style of unusually high x-height. It was initially intended to serve as a display version but has been used for text, in which its tight spacing and high x-height gives it a somewhat hectoring appearance. As a result, it has proven somewhat controversial among designers; it is generally considered poorly proportioned for body text. It remains the corporate font of the California State University system in printed text. As seen below, it was also modified into Apple Garamond which served as Apple's corporate font from 1984 until replacement starting in 2002 with Myriad. Publishers using it included O'Reilly Media and French publisher Actes Sud.

==== Cormorant ====
An open-source adaptation of Garamond intended for display sizes, designed by Christian Thalmann and co-released with Google Fonts. It features a delicate style suitable for printing at larger sizes, and considerable contrast in stroke weight in its larger sizes. Thalmann added several unusual alternate designs such as an upright italic and unicase styles, as well as exaggerated, highly slanting accents.

==== Sans-serif designs ====
Several sans-serif typefaces have been published that are based on the proportions of Garamond-style fonts, both as standalone designs or as part of a font superfamily with matching serif and sans-serif fonts. One example is Claude Sans, a humanist sans-serif based on the letterforms of Jannon's type, created by Alan Meeks and published by Letraset and later ITC.

== In popular culture ==
- In Umberto Eco's novel Foucault's Pendulum, the protagonists work for a pair of related publishing companies, Garamond and Manuzio, both owned by a Mister Garamond.
- Garamond is the name of a character in the Wii game Super Paper Mario. He appears in the world of Flopside (the mirror-image of Flipside, where the game begins). He is a prolific and highly successful author, unlike his Flipside counterpart, Helvetica.
- For many years the masthead of British newspaper The Guardian used "The" in italic 'Garamond' and "Guardian" in bold Helvetica.
- A condensed variant of ITC Garamond was adopted by Apple in 1984 upon the release of the Macintosh, known as Apple Garamond. This was a proprietary font not publicly available, less condensed than the publicly released ITC Garamond Condensed.
- One of the initial goals of the literary journal Timothy McSweeney's Quarterly Concern was to use only a single font: Garamond 3. The editor of the journal, Dave Eggers, has stated that it is his favourite font, "because it looked good in so many permutations—italics, small caps, all caps, tracked out, justified or not."
- In Robin Sloan's fantasy novel Mr. Penumbra's 24-Hour Bookstore several character names derive from historical figures associated with the Garamond typeface.
- In Neil Gaiman's fantasy novel Stardust (Being A Romance Within The Realms of Faerie), one of the realms of Faerie is called Garamond. It is ruled by the Squire of Garamond, whose "only heir was transformed into a Gruntling Pig-wiggin." The realm occurs in the idiom "something is so loud it can be heard from Garamond to Stormhold" and includes an unnamed island in a lake that is the only known origin of a magical herb called Limbus Grass, which compels those who eat it to answer any question truthfully.
- In Brooklyn 99 Season 4 Episode 7, Jake prints a sign for his girlfriend's father: "I printed out a sign specially for him, using his favorite font, Garamond"

=== Printer ink claim ===
It has been claimed that Garamond uses much less ink than Times New Roman at a similar point size, so changing to Garamond could be a cost-saver for large organizations that print large numbers of documents, especially if using inkjet printers. Garamond, along with Times New Roman and Century Gothic, has been identified by the GSA as a "toner-efficient" font.

This claim has been criticised as a misinterpretation of how typefaces are actually measured and what printing methods are desirable. Monotype Garamond, the version bundled with Microsoft Office, has a generally smaller design at the same nominal point size compared to Times New Roman and quite spindly strokes, giving it a more elegant but less readable appearance. In order to increase the legibility of Garamond, a common approach in typography is to increase text size such that the height of its lower-case characters (i.e., the absolute x-height of the font) matches that of Times New Roman, which counterbalances cost savings. Thomas Phinney, an expert on digital fonts, noted that the effect of simply swapping Garamond in would be compromised legibility: "any of those changes, swapping to a font that sets smaller at the same nominal point size, or actually reducing the point size, or picking a thinner typeface, will reduce the legibility of the text." Professional type designer Jackson Cavanaugh commented "If we're actually interested in reducing waste, just printing less – using less paper – is obviously more efficient."

== Gallery ==
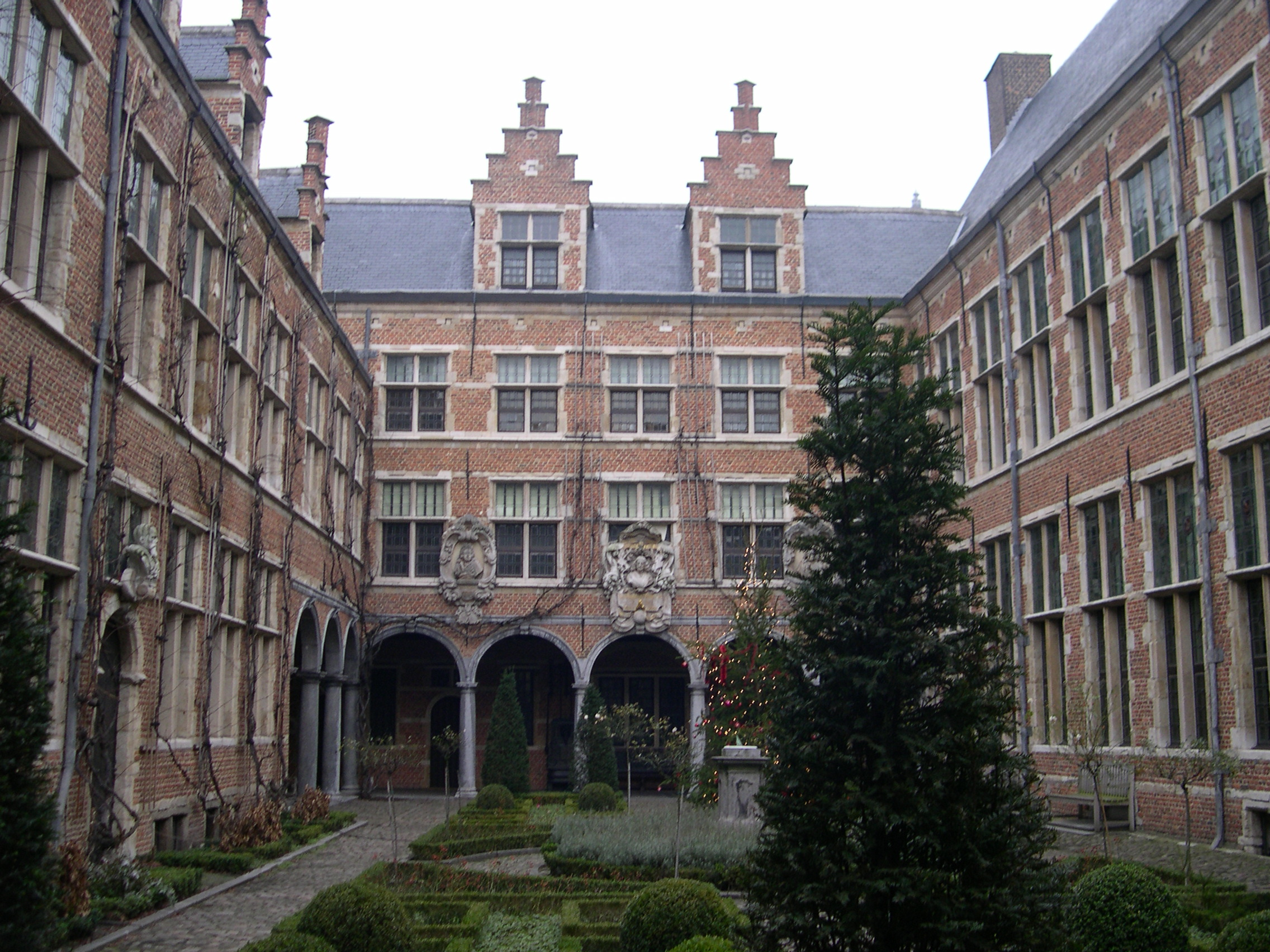
The Plantin-Moretus Museum, which preserves original Garamond punches and matrices.

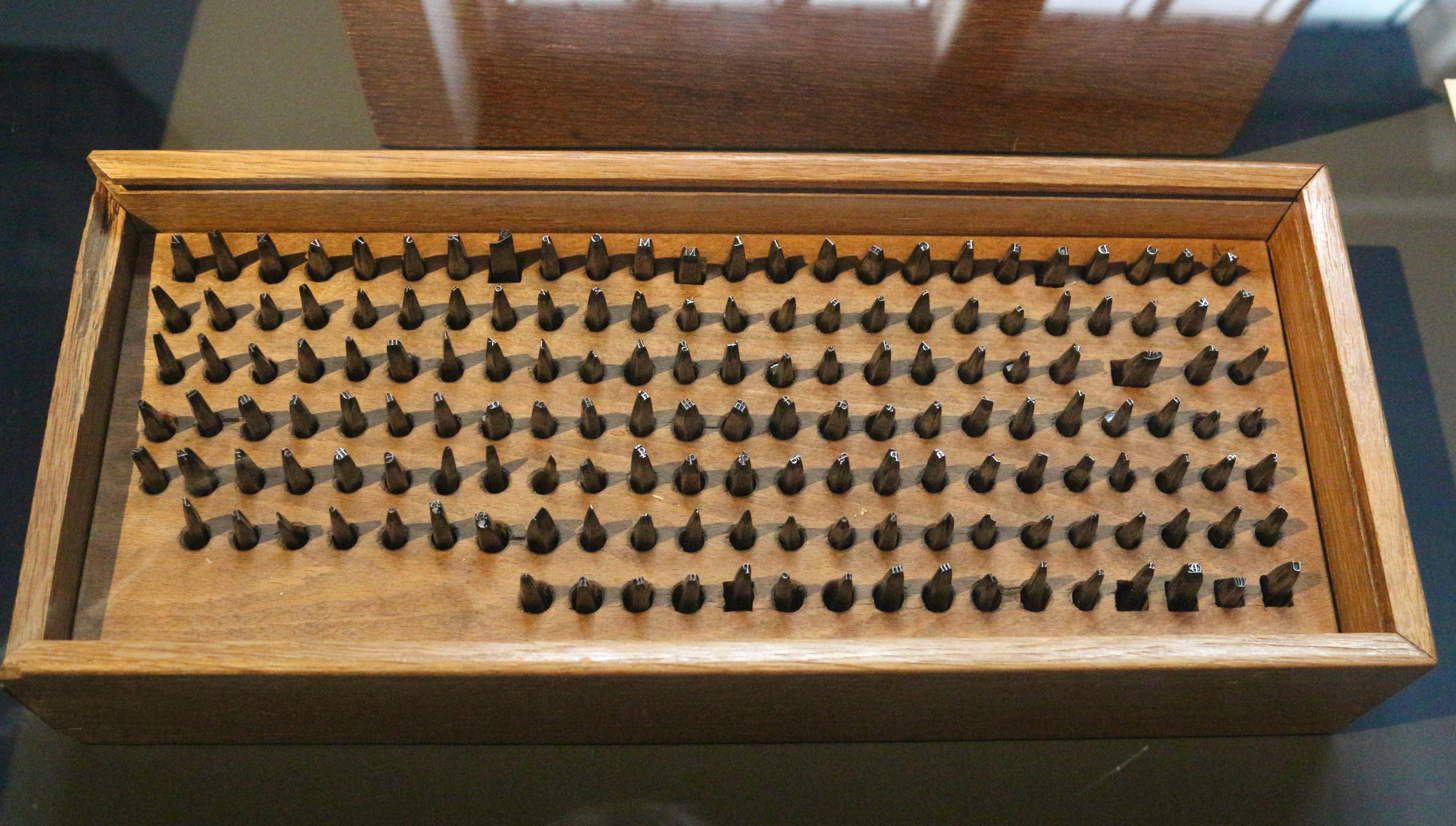
Garamond's Augustine Romaine punches at the Plantin-Moretus Museum

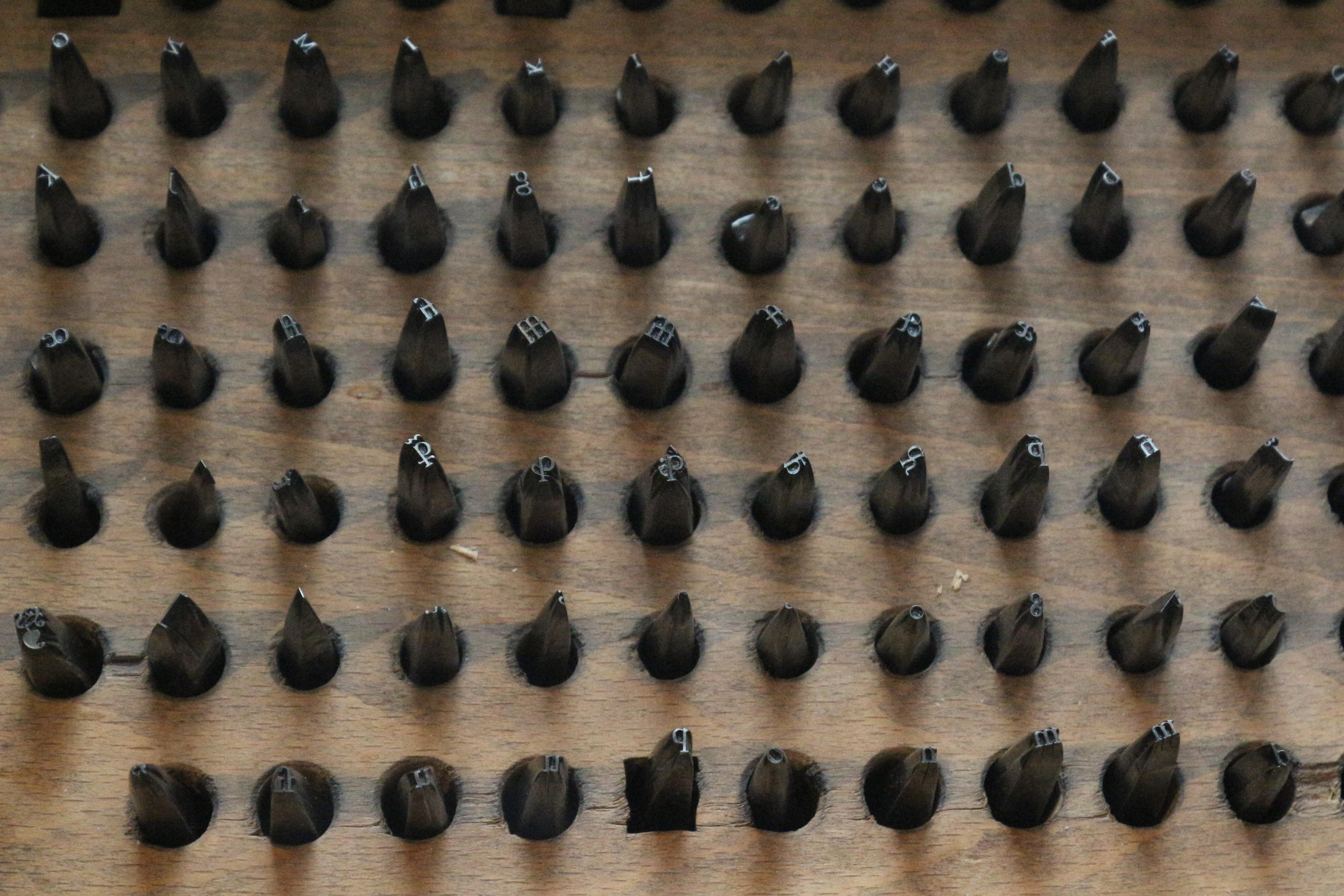
Augustine Romaine punches, detail view

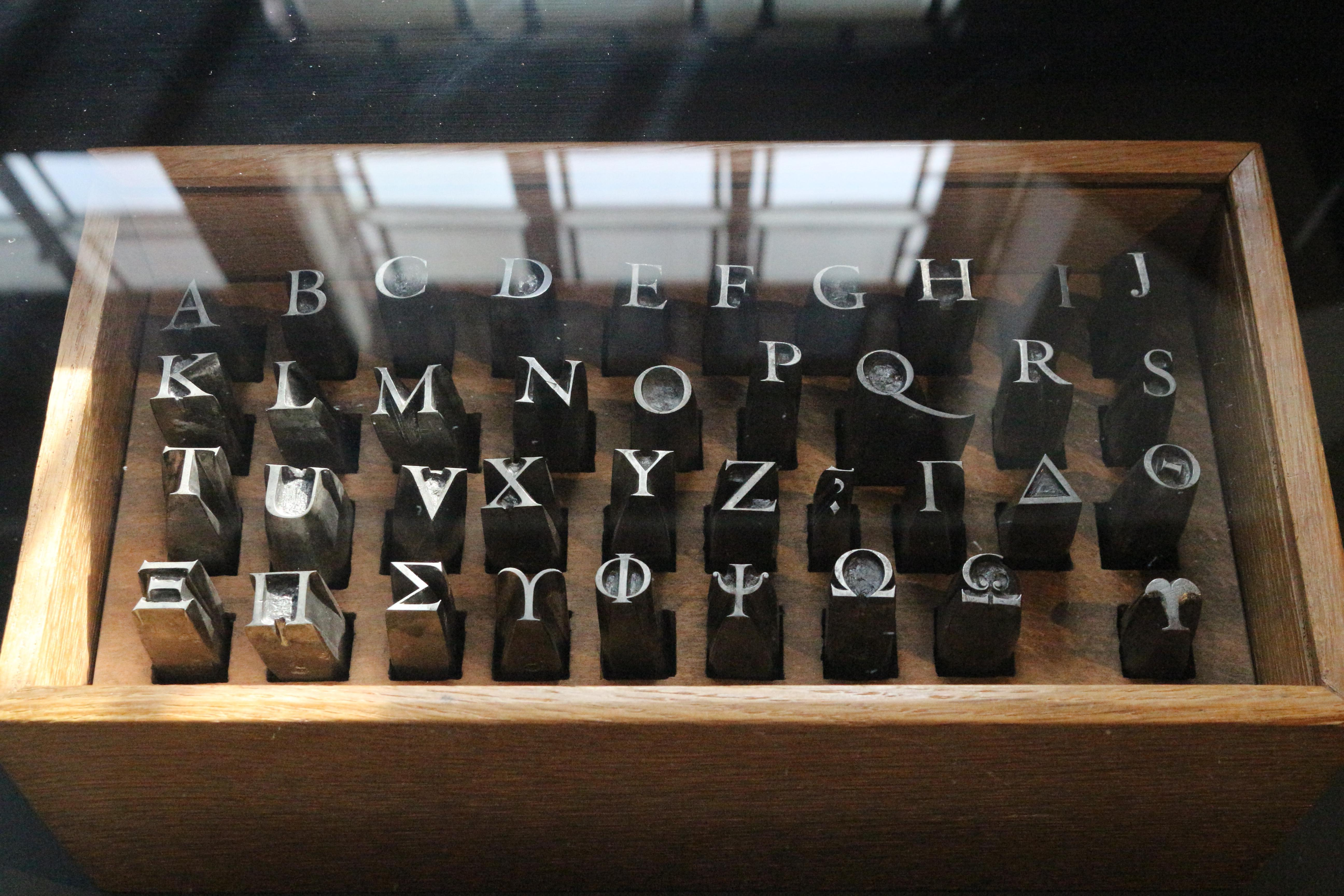
Large punches begun by Garamond but unfinished on his death and completed by Jacob Sabon and van den Keere (mirror image).

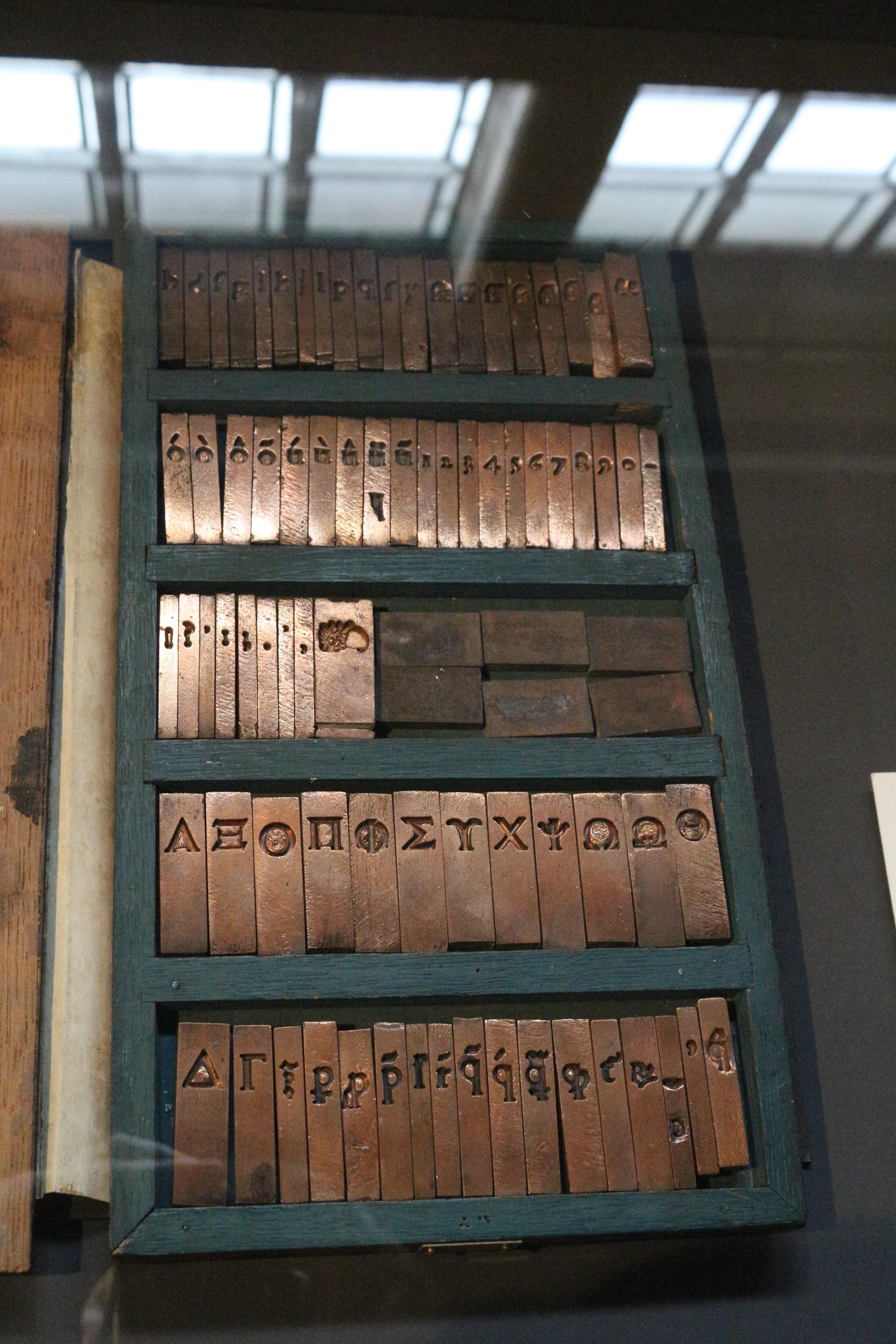
Gros-canon matrices

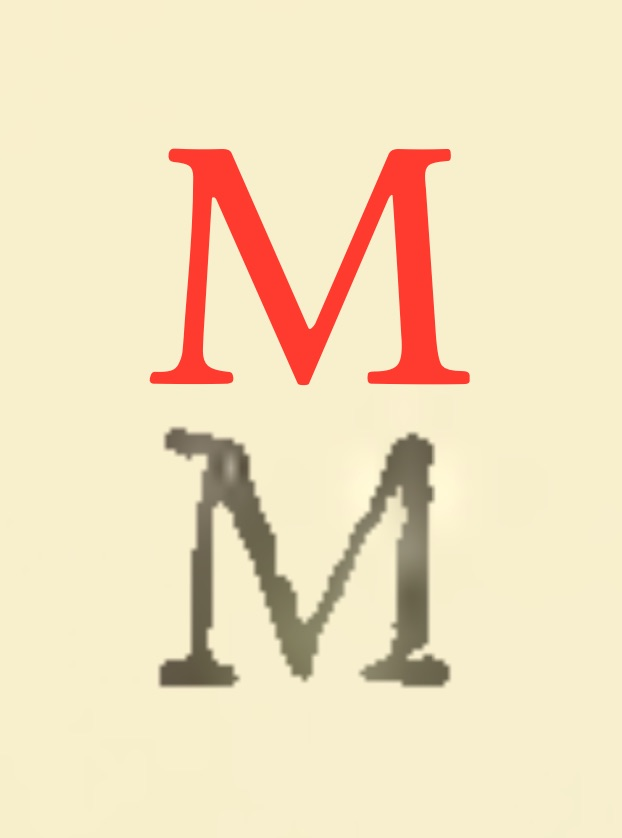
The asymmetrical 'Bembo M' in a French textbook

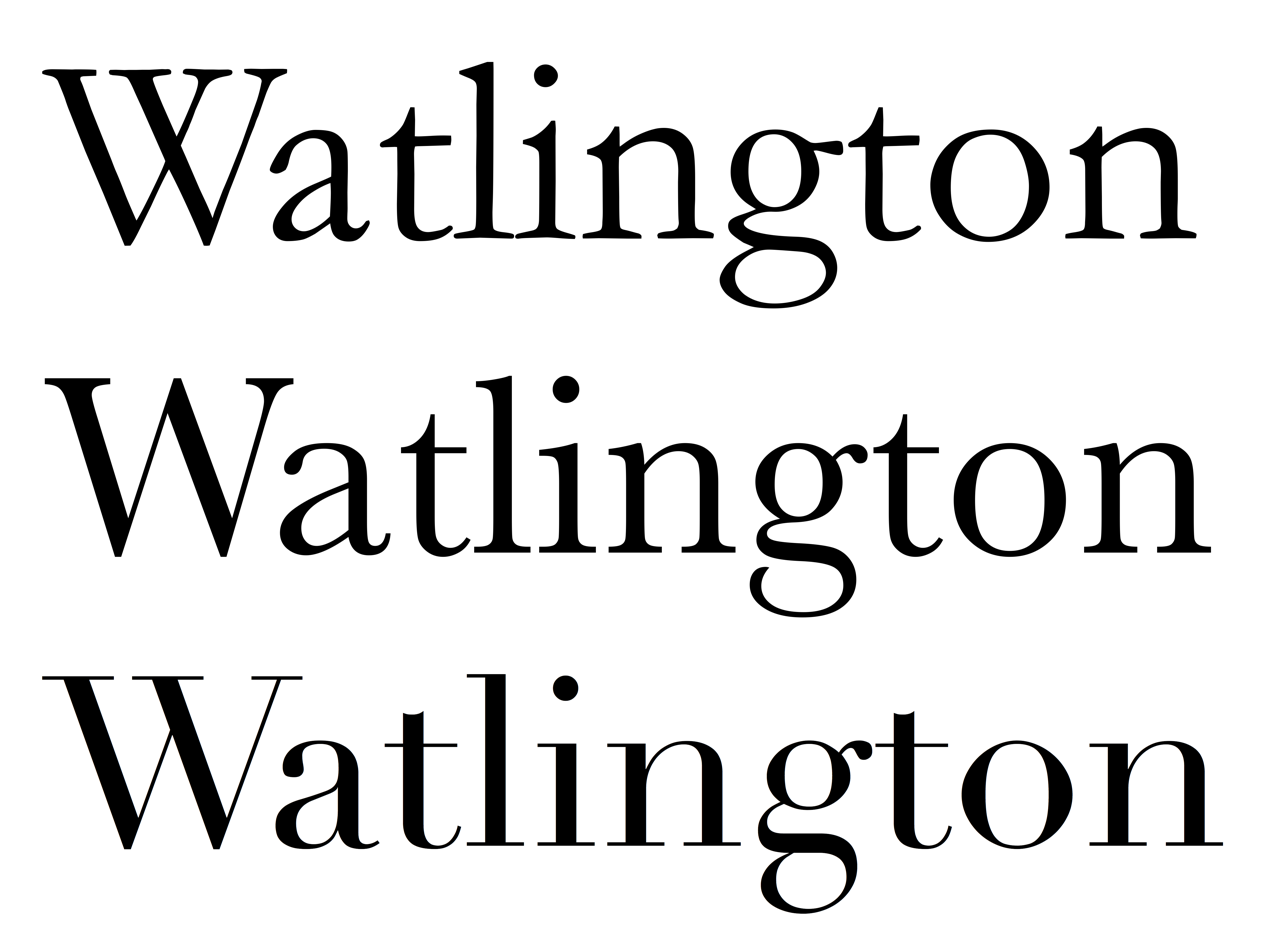
Monotype Garamond (based on Jannon) compared to the more geometric transitional serif and Didone type that replaced old-styles during the eighteenth century.

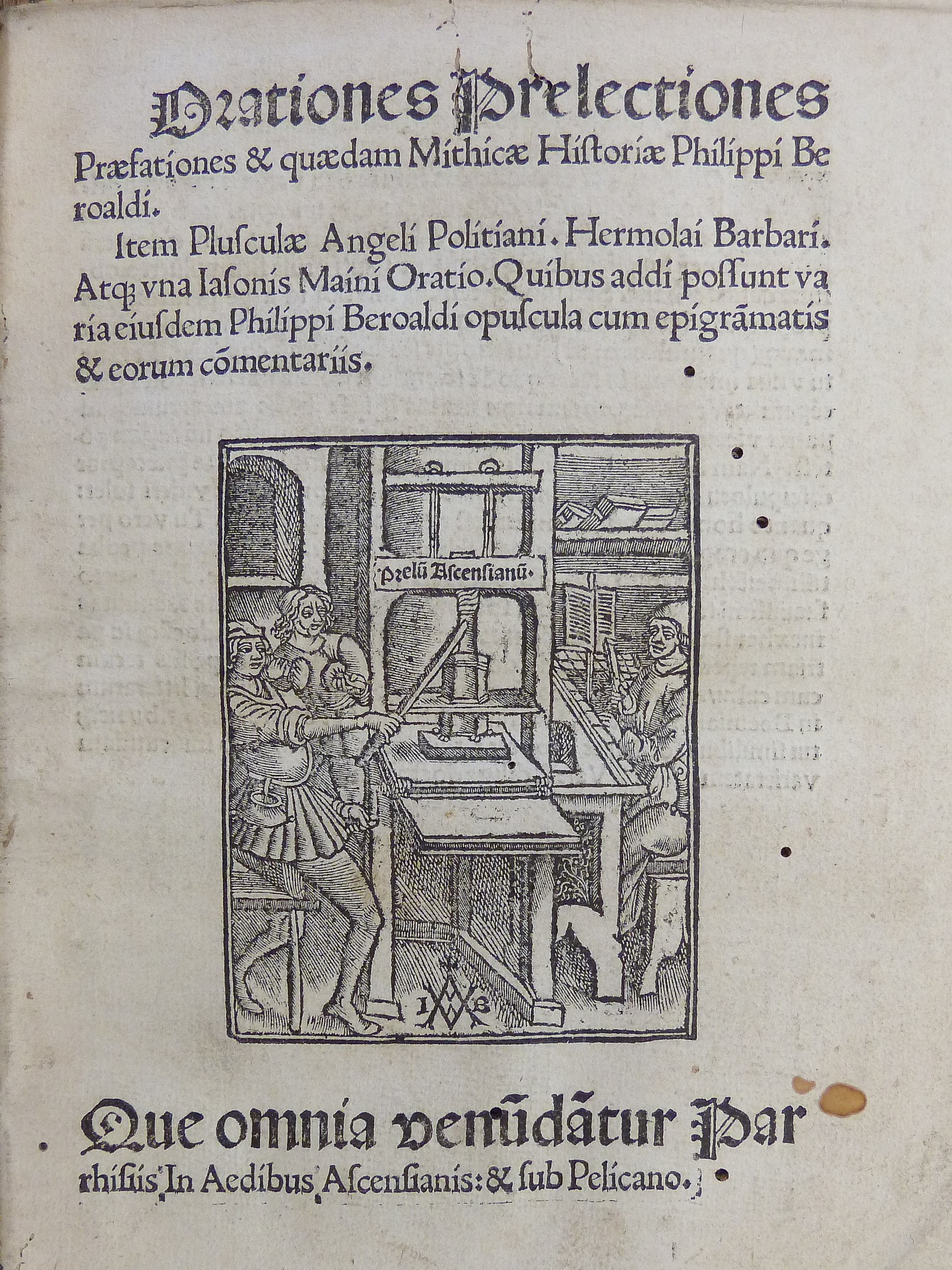
A title page printed in Paris in 1508 showing the style preceding the 1530s: a font dark in colour, with wide capitals, tilted 'e's, large dots on the 'i' recalling calligraphy and blackletter headings.

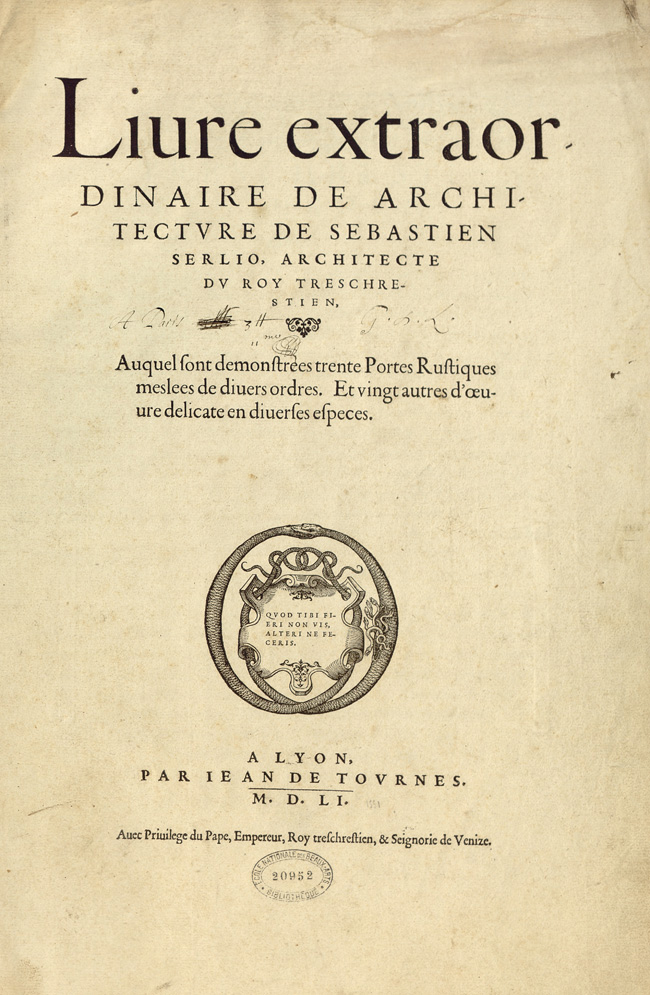
A very large-size font (c. 120 pt) in a 1551 book by Jean de Tournes, showing Garalde letterforms magnified to display size with sharpened contrast. Designer unknown.

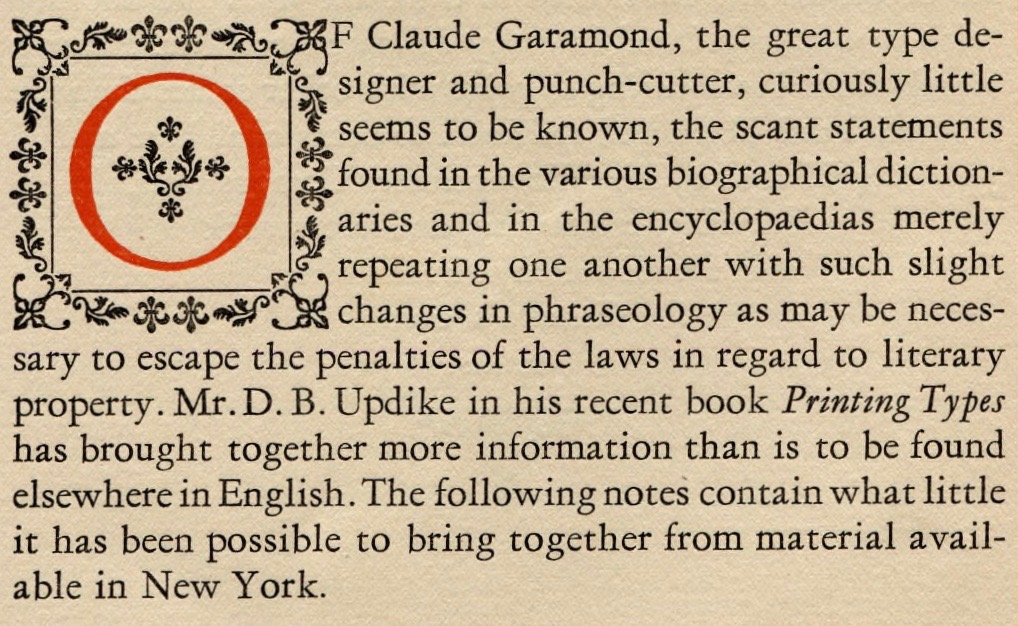
Frederic Goudy's Garamont type for the American Monotype company in close-up.

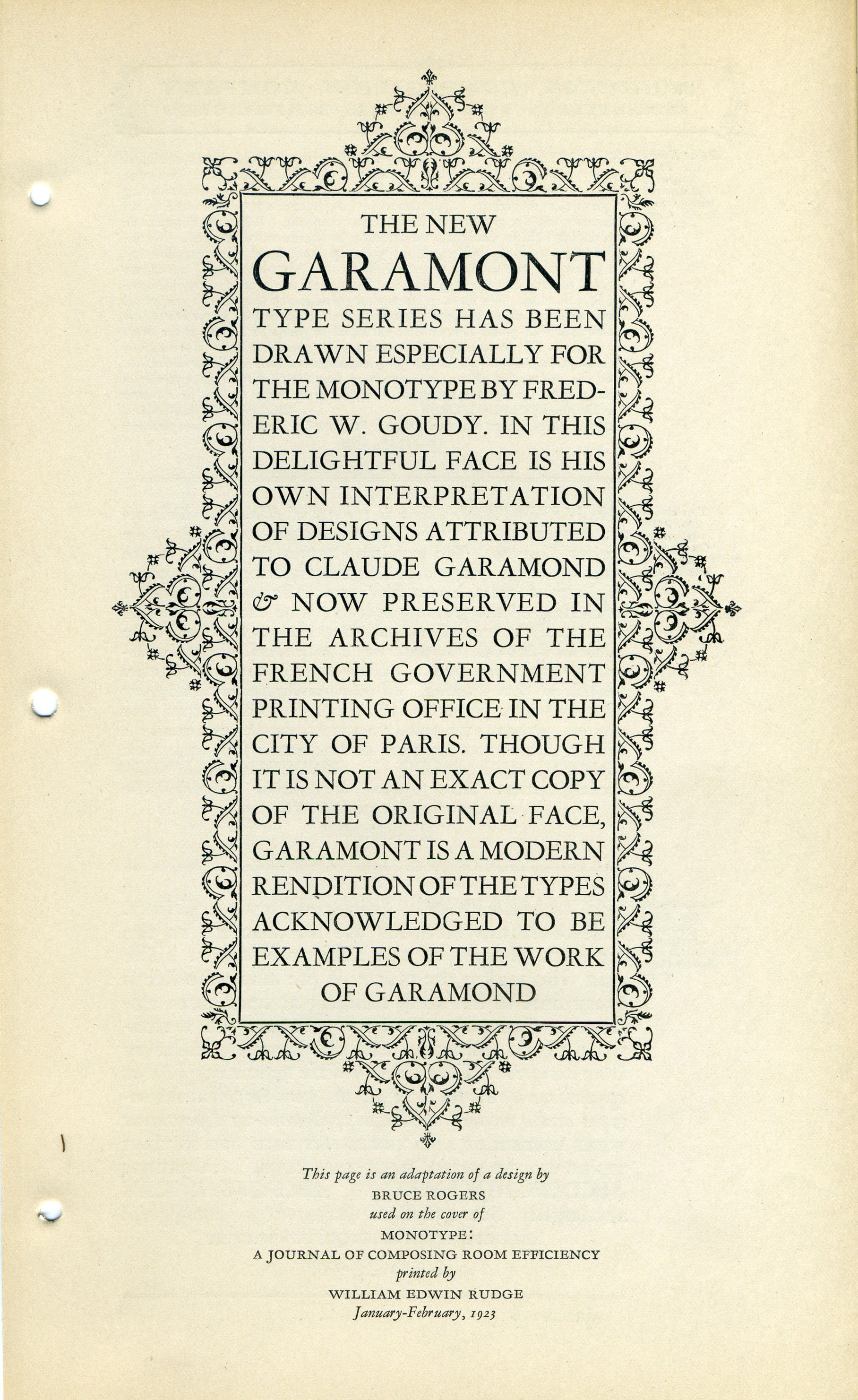
The American Monotype's Garamont specimen, showing the capitals.

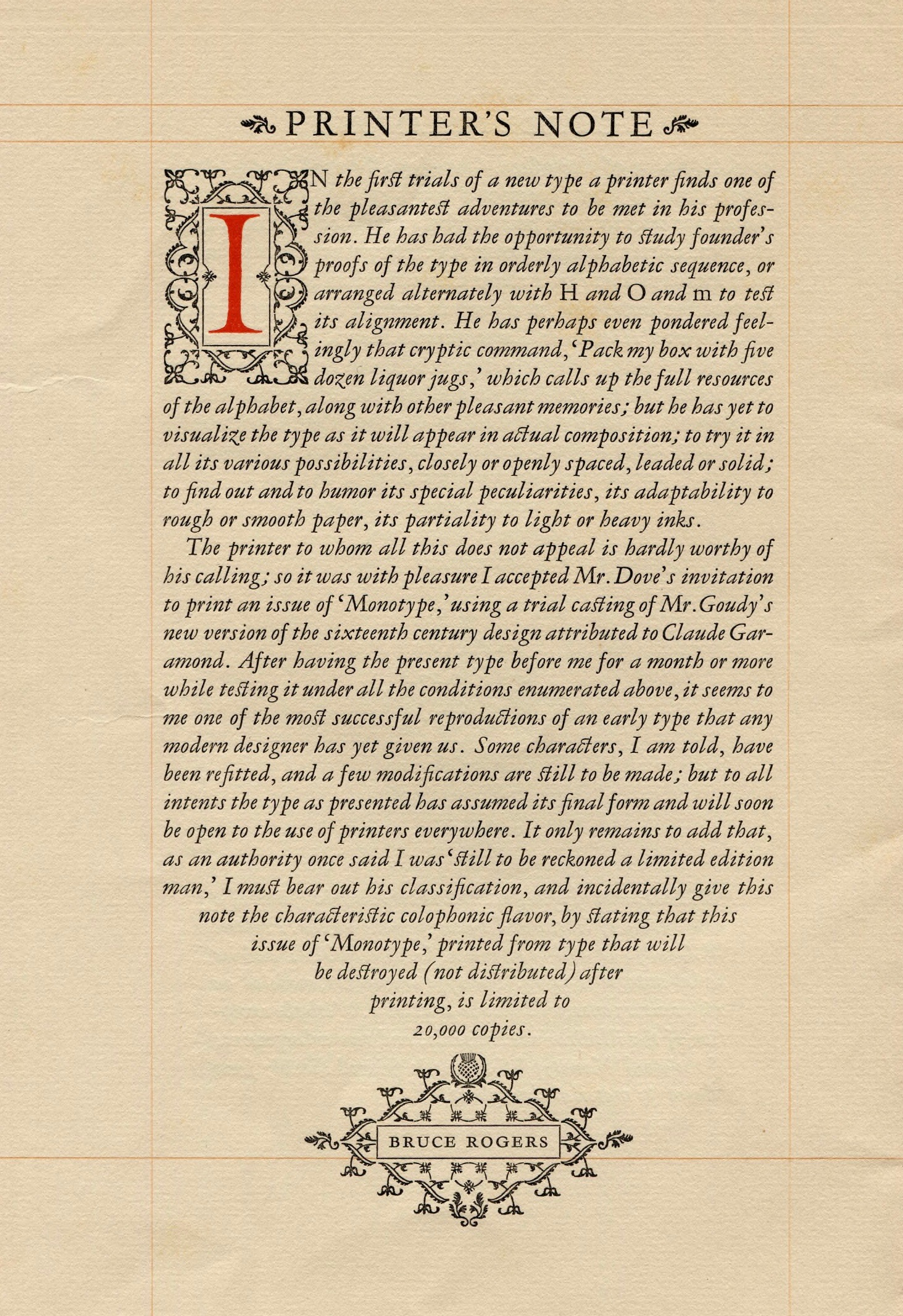
The colophon of Monotype's Garamont sample, showing the italic and ligatures.

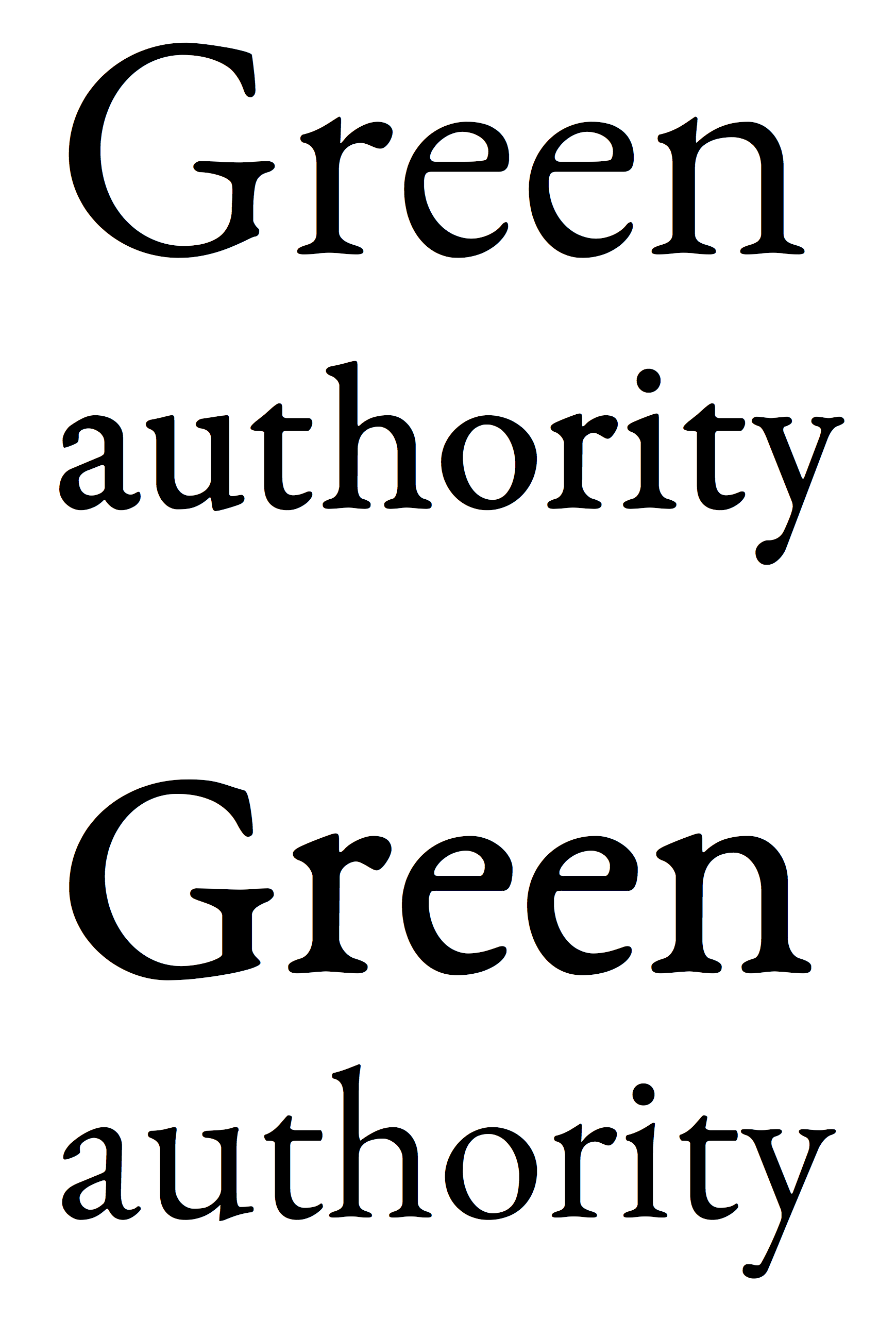
Optical sizes in EB Garamond. Top, correct use: large text more delicate, small text more solid. Below, wrong way round.

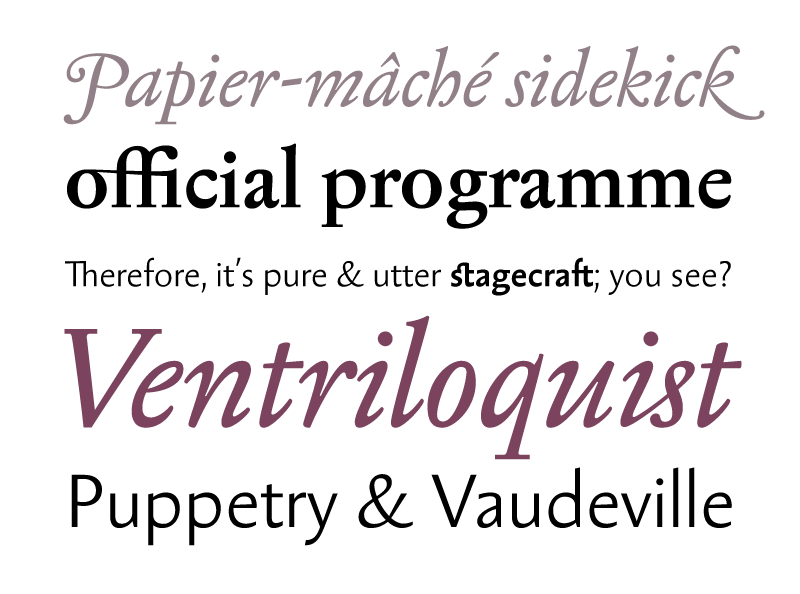
A specimen of František Štorm's revival of Jannon's type with bold and sans-serif derivatives.

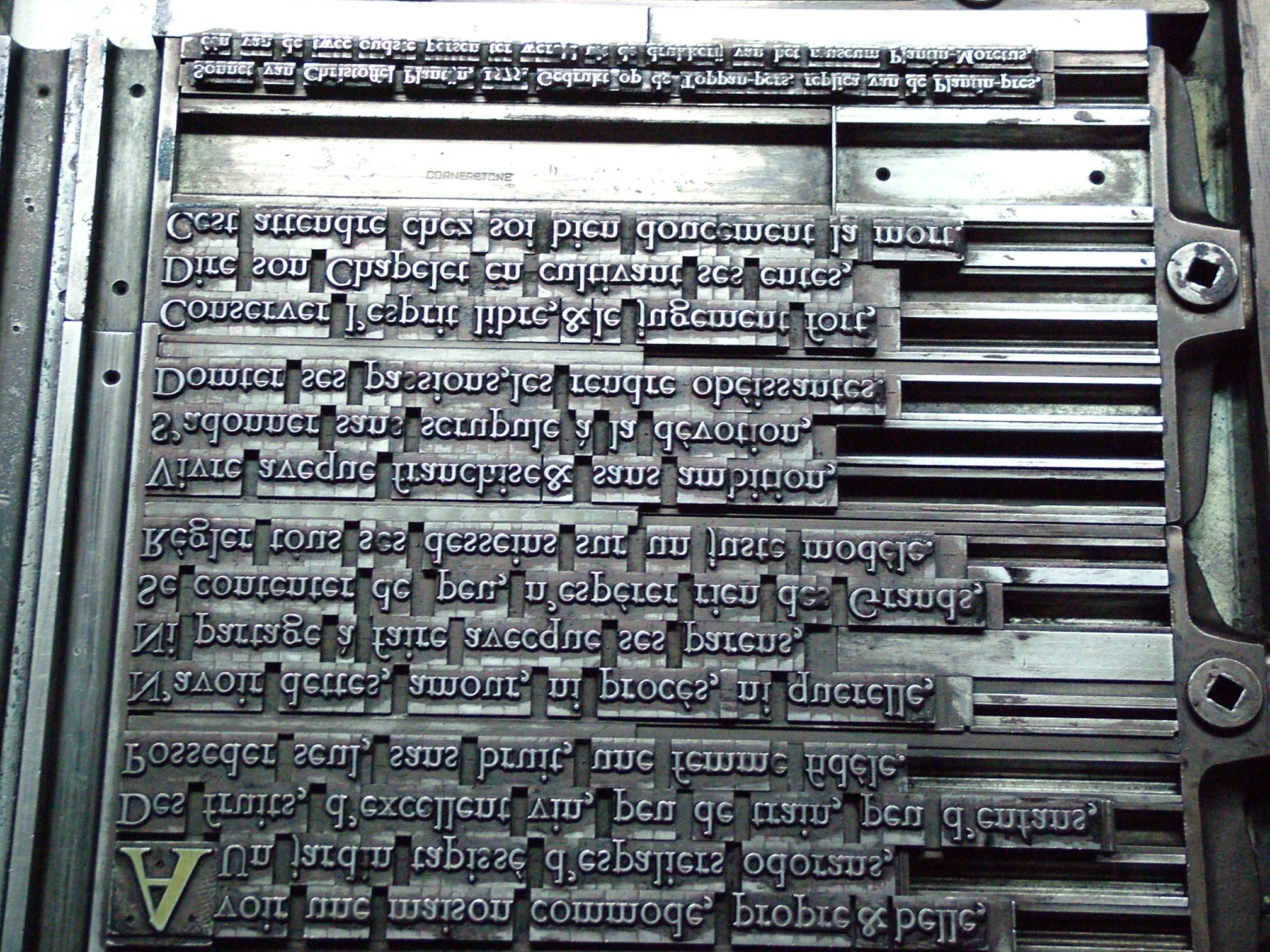
Type set up in a forme at the Plantin-Moretus Museum. Text is a sonnet by Plantin.

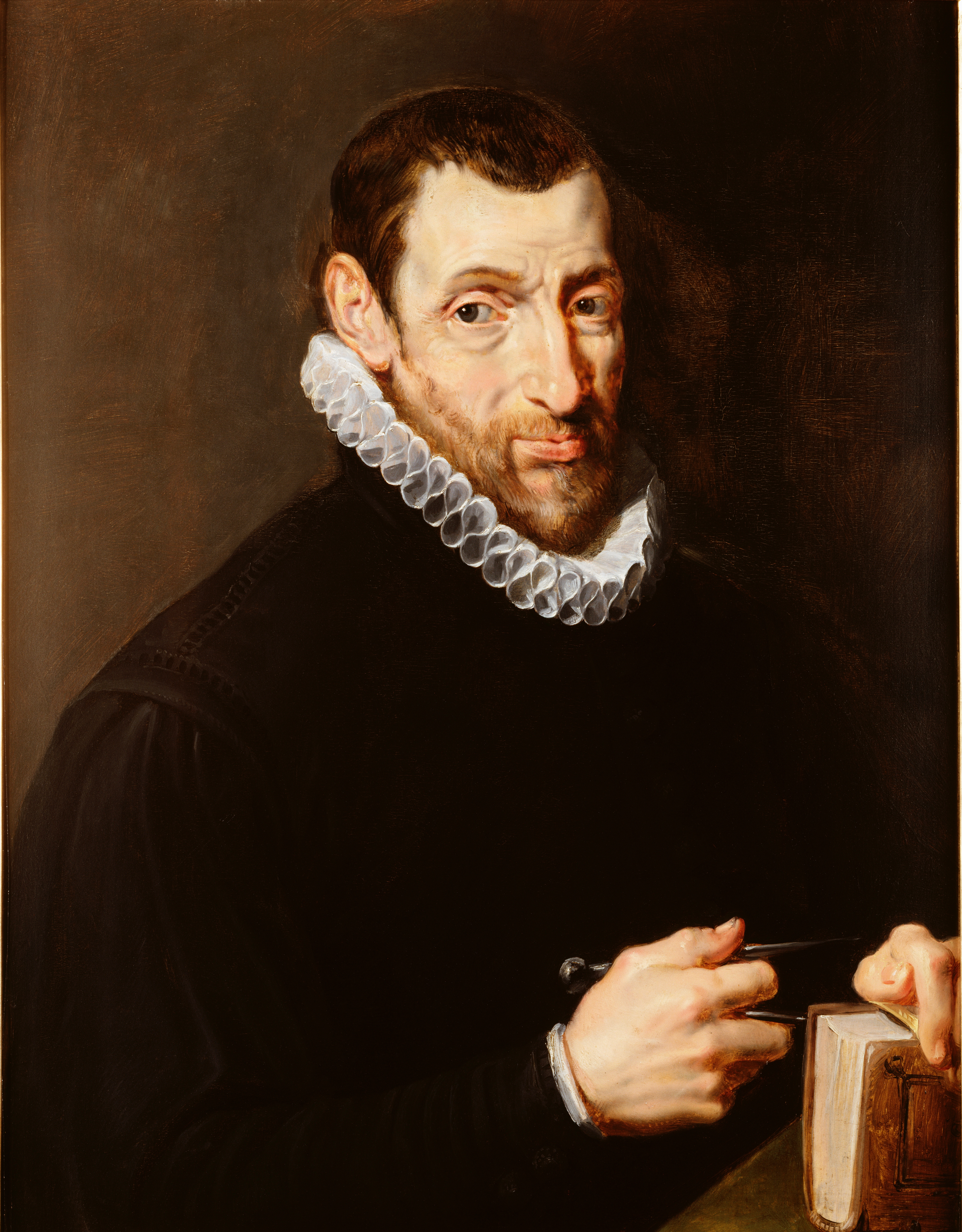
Plantin painted posthumously by Rubens.
