= Signature (typography journal) =

British magazine of typography and fine art in 1930-50s

Signature: A Quadrimestrial of Typography and the Graphic Arts was a British magazine of typography and the graphic arts. Published and edited by Oliver Simon, it was subsidised and printed by the Curwen Press, of which Simon was a director. It appeared in fifteen volumes from 1935 to 1940, and eighteen volumes from 1946 to 1954 as a new series.

== As a typographic magazine ==
Signature has been regarded historically as primarily a typographic magazine, given Simon’s promise in the original prospectus to keep its readers informed of the main current typographic events. It has also been bracketed with other inter-war periodicals of typography, The Fleuron and Typography, as the subject of a book by Grant Shipcott which concentrates on the typographical aspects. Shipcott praised the quality of design and production, while faulting Signature for being weighted towards the historical rather than the contemporary.

== Forum for graphic artists ==
However, Simon’s pronounced sympathy for contemporary art meant that along with essays by leading writers of typography and the book arts, such as Beatrice Warde (using the pseudonym Paul Beaujon) and Stanley Morison, Signature also included early original graphic work and writings on their art by both Graham Sutherland and John Piper. Art historian Andrew Causey observed that "no journal can make a greater claim to have stimulated the taste that became neo-romanticism", a term applied to the imaginative and often quite abstract landscape-based painting of Paul Nash, Graham Sutherland, John Piper, and others in the late 1930s and 1940s. Simon was a friend and early patron of both Sutherland and Piper, and a friend of Paul Nash since 1919.

The lithographic work by Sutherland that Simon commissioned for the Curwen Press Newsletter cover in 1936 is a broad adaptation of the design of his painting Mobile Mask shown at the International Surrealism Exhibition at the Burlington Galleries London in June and July 1936. Simon noted that it "evoked at the time a certain amount of hostility both inside and outside the Press". From Edward Bawden, it drew "congratulations on the new Newsletter and the first appearance of surrealism in the commercial field". In 1937 Sutherland's advertisement for zinc lithographic plates in Signature issue six and his menu design for the 56th Dinner of the Double Crown Club reproduced in issue five both use elements of surrealism. The frontispiece of issue nine in July 1938 was an etching and aquatint by Sutherland titled Clegyr Boia. This was Sutherland's first use of aquatint with etching, and in his new style, quite different from his earlier etchings.

== Published issues ==
Issue Five, March 1937 included three auto-lithographs by Eric Ravilious. These were his second, third and fourth published lithographs and were early designs for his book High Street.

Issue Six, July 1937 included the first published lithograph by John Piper. The work Invention in Colour is one of only two abstract lithographs that Piper made. For issue Thirteen, May 1939, Piper contributed an auto-lithograph titled Cheltenham, an architectural subject more in the style with which he would become associated.

Many of Signature's articles were the first ever authoritative essays on subjects, for example on the books published by Ambroise Vollard, and the first hand-list of books illustrated by Picasso, which the artist himself corrected. The growing influence before World War II of William Blake on many artists shone through. The excavation and rehabilitation of the artistic reputations of artists well known and appreciated today such as Samuel Palmer and Henry Fuseli began in Signature and have been said to stand out as 'moments when a change of direction in art can be discerned'. Essays and/or artwork by artists such as Edward Ardizzone, Edward Bawden, Barnett Freedman, Lynton Lamb, Enid Marx, and Paul Nash also featured regularly.

Signature was Simon’s second periodical after The Fleuron which he edited with Stanley Morison. It is one of a series of British typographic magazines including The Fleuron (1923–1930), the Monotype Recorder, Typography (1936–1939), Alphabet and Image (1946–1952), Typographica (1949–1967), Motif (1958–1967), Baseline (1979–present), The Matrix (1981–present) and Eye (1990–present).
