= Fleuron =

A fleuron is one of several types of flower-like ornament used in various areas of art and design, including:

- Fleuron (architecture), a decorative architectural element
- Fleuron (typography), a decorative typographical element such as ❦ or 🙘
- Fleuron (bookbinding), an element in gold-tooled bindings

Other meanings include:

- The Fleuron, a British journal of typography
- Svend Fleuron, Danish novelist
