= Jean Jannon =

17th-century French typographer

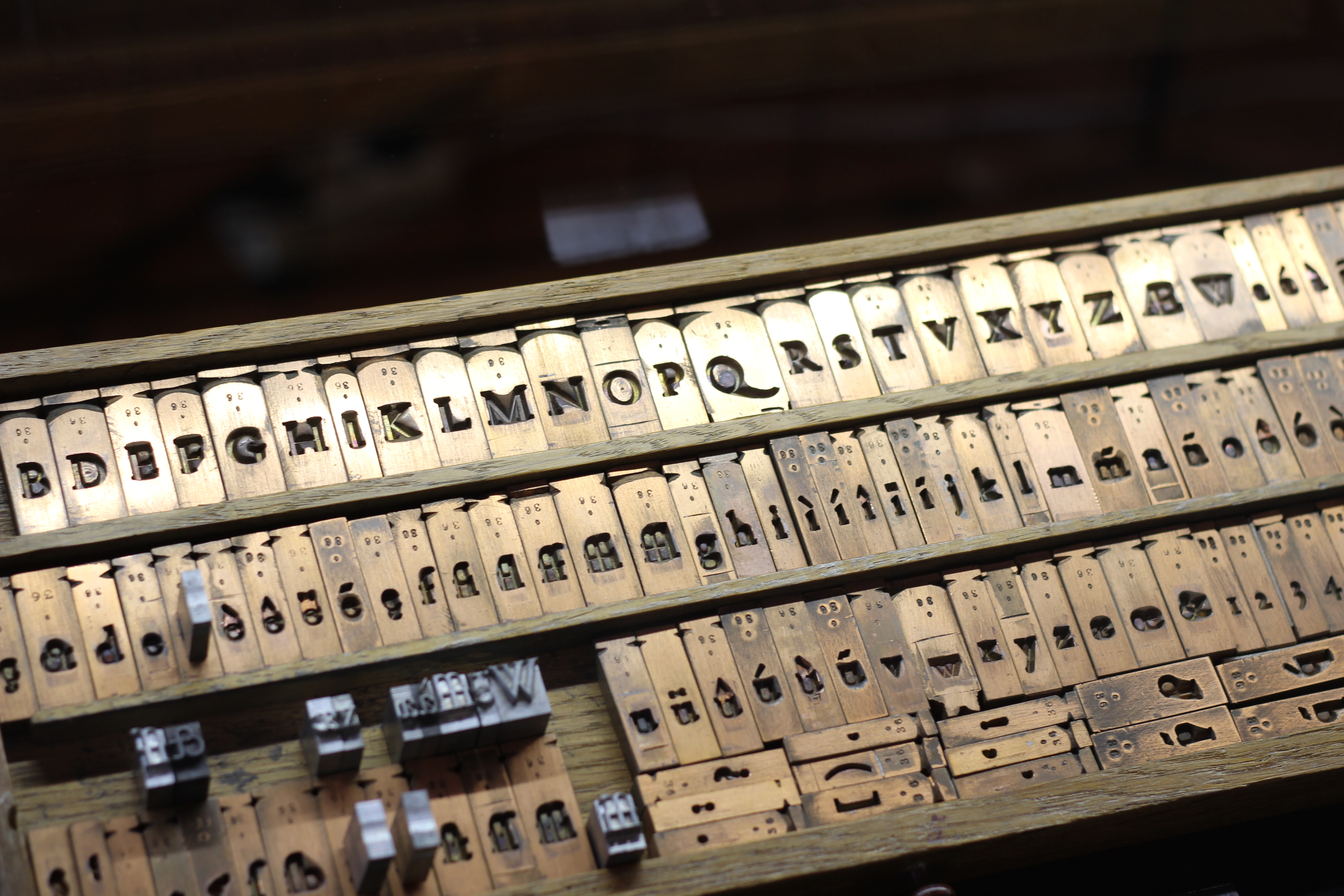
The matrices of Jannon's Imprimerie nationale type.

Jean Jannon (1580 – 20 December 1658) was a French Protestant printer, type designer, punchcutter and typefounder active in Sedan in the seventeenth century. He was a reasonably prolific printer by contemporary standards, printing several hundred books.

== Career ==
Jannon began his career as a printer, first attested in Paris, where he apparently worked for the Estienne family in his early career, and then in Sedan. He mentions in one preface of hearing of the early history of printing in Mainz, so possibly he served an apprenticeship in Germany.

Jannon may have left Paris due to lack of work there or personal conflicts: his friend at the time, diarist Pierre de L'Estoile, recorded in his diary that he met with disapproval with Huguenot authorities for taking on the job of printing a piece of Catholic propaganda. According to d'Estoile the response of formal approbation from local Huguenot authorities "upset him badly", and he commented that they would be worse than Jesuits if given the chance.

Jannon married first Anne de Quingé, who died in 1618. Two years later he married Marie Demangin, who had had left her husband. A report from the Council of the Reformed Church of Mainz confirming that the remarriage was acceptable described as her former husband's conduct as a proven series of "adulteries, polygamies and debaucheries".

After working in Paris Jannon established a career as printer for the Protestant Academy of Sedan in what is now north-eastern France. Sedan at the time enjoyed an unstable independence as a principality at a time when the French government had conceded through the Edict of Nantes to allowing a complicated system of restricted liberties for Protestants. He also established a second career as a punchcutter, in his thirties by his report. In 1640 he left Sedan and returned to Paris. Despite his religious views, the royal printing office of France bought matrices, moulds used to cast metal type, from him in 1641 for three large size of type. These matrices survive and remain in the government collection. He was otherwise particularly respected for his engraving of an extremely small size of type, known as Sédanoise, which was popular.

In 1640, Jannon left Sedan for Paris to take over the press of his son, who had recently died. Four years later, his printing office in Caen was raided by authorities concerned that he may have been publishing banned material. While not imprisoned, Jannon ultimately returned to Sedan and spent the rest of his life there.

Following his death, the printing-office at Sedan continued in operation; his family gave up his type foundry in 1664. It was reported to have been taken over by Langlois in Paris, although Abraham van Dijck in the 1670s said he intended to buy matrices from Sedan so (if his information was not out of date) some materials might have remained there.

== Types ==
Jannon type specimen of their Caractères de l'Université. Sedan, 1621. Bibliothèque Mazarine, Paris

Jannon engraved decorative material, signed with an II monogram. He took up engraving metal type-quite late in life by the standards of the period, in his thirties by his report. Jannon wrote in his 1621 specimen that:

Seeing that for some time many persons have had to do with the art [of printing] who have greatly lowered it…the desire came upon me to try if I might imitate, after some fashion, some one among those who honourably busied themselves with the art, [men whose deaths] I hear regretted every day [Jannon mentions some eminent printers of the previous century]…and inasmuch as I could not accomplish this design for lack of types which I needed…[some typefounders] would not, and others could not furnish me with what I lacked [so] I resolved, about six years ago, to turn my hand in good earnest to the making of punches, matrices and moulds for all sorts of characters, for the accommodation both of the public and of myself.

Jannon was one of the few punchcutters active in early seventeenth century France. This is perhaps owing to an economic decline over the previous century and due to pre-existing typefaces made during the mid-sixteenth century saturating the market.

Jannon's typefaces are based on the style of the previous century, especially the roman. Some differences in the roman are his characteristic 'a' with a curved bowl and the top left serifs of letters such as 'm' and 'p', with a distinctive scooped-out form. (Note: Vervliet provides an eight-way comparison of Jannon's type with seven typefaces of the previous century.) His italics are more distinctive and eccentric, being steeply slanted and with very obviously variable angle of slant on the capitals. Opinions on the aesthetic quality of his type has varied: Warde thought it "so technically brilliant as to be decadent...of slight value as a book face", H. D. L. Vervliet described it as "famous not so much for the quality of the design but as for the long-term confusion it created" and Hugh Williamson considered his type to lack the "perfection of clarity and grace" of the sixteenth century, although many reproductions of his work were certainly popular in printing in the twentieth century.

=== Garamond misattribution ===
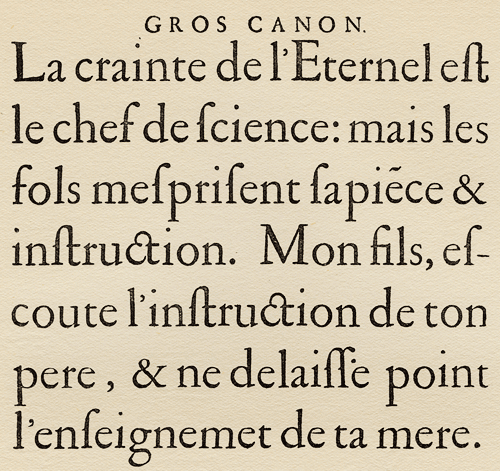
An excerpt from Jannon's specimen of 1621.

Despite a distinguished career as a printer, Jannon is perhaps most famous for a long-lasting historical misattribution. In 1641, the Imprimerie royale, or royal printing office, purchased matrices, the moulds used to cast metal type, from him. (Note: The contract is actually made for one 'Nicholas Jannon', which historians have assumed to be a mistake. Despite the purchase, it is not clear that the office ever much used Jannon's type: historian James Mosley has reported being unable to find books printed by the Imprimerie that use more than a few specific sizes of italic, although "it is not easy to prove a negative".) By the mid-nineteenth century, Jannon's matrices formed the only substantial collection of printing materials in the Latin alphabet left in Paris from before the eighteenth century. The matrices came to be attributed to Claude Garamond (d. 1561), a revered punchcutter of the sixteenth century who was known to have made punches for the government in the Greek alphabet, albeit a century before the Imprimerie was established. The attribution came to be considered certain by the Imprimerie's director Arthur Christian. Doubt began to be raised by historian Jean Paillard in 1914, but he died in the First World War soon after publishing his conclusions and his work remained little-read.

Several early revivals of Jannon's type were made under the name of 'Garamond'. 'Garamond' fonts actually based on Jannon's work include American Type Founders' Garamond, later reissued by Linotype as Garamond No. 3, Monotype Garamond, the version included with Microsoft Office, and Frederic Goudy's Garamont (following the most common spelling of Garamond's name in his lifetime). The mistake was finally disproved in 1926 by Beatrice Warde (writing under the pseudonym of "Paul Beaujon"), based on the work of Paillard and her discovery of material printed by Jannon himself in London and Paris libraries. (Note: Warde's persona of 'Paul Beaujon' was intended to gain her more respect in a masculine industry; Warde later said she imagined him to have "[a] long grey beard, four grandchildren, a great interest in antique furniture and a rather vague address in Montparesse." Typifying her sense of humour, she reported her conclusions to her editor Stanley Morison, a convert to Catholicism, with a telegram beginning "JANNON SPECIMEN SIMPLY GORGEOUS SHOWS ALL SIZES HIS TYPES WERE APPROPRIATED BY RAPACIOUS PAPIST GOVERNMENT..." (Warde at the time believed that the raid in Caen had been the source of the Imprimerie's types, since at the time the purchase order was not known.) She noted in later life that her readers were surprised to see an article supposedly by a Frenchman quoting The Hunting of the Snark.) A former librarian at American Type Founders, she had been privately told by the company's archivist Henry Lewis Bullen (perhaps aware of Paillard's work) that he doubted his company's "Garamond" was really from the sixteenth century, noting that he could not find it used in a book from the period.

František Štorm's 2010 revival, Jannon Pro, is one of the few modern revivals of Jannon's work released under his name.

=== Caractères de l'Université ===
Jannon's type from an Imprimerie nationale specimen. The 'J' is a later addition.

By the nineteenth century, Jannon's matrices had come to be known as the Caractères de l'Université (Characters of the University). The origin of this name is uncertain. It has sometimes been claimed that this term was an official name designated for the Jannon type by Cardinal Richelieu, while Warde in 1926 more plausibly suggested it might be a garbled recollection of Jannon's work with the Sedan Academy, which operated much like a university despite not using the name. Carter in the 1970s followed this conclusion. Mosley, however, concludes that no report of the term (or much use of Jannon's type at all) exists before the nineteenth century, and it may originate from a generic term of the previous century simply meaning older or more conservative typeface designs, perhaps those preferred in academic publishing.

Jannon's specimen survives in a single copy at the Bibliothèque Mazarine in Paris. (Note: Mosley notes that J.B. Brincourt, Jannons's main French biographer, wrote a description of his specimen that does not match the known copy, but if he had seen "another and a more complete copy of the specimen" its location is not known.) Warde, again under the pseudonym of Beaujon, published a facsimile reprint in 1927.
