= Frederic Goudy =

American printer and type designer (1865–1947)

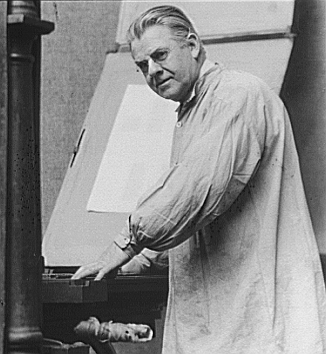
- Goudy in 1924
- Born: Frederic William Goudy; March 8, 1865; Bloomington, Illinois, U.S.
- Died: May 11, 1947 (aged 82); Marlborough, New York, U.S.
- Occupations: Printer; artist; type designer
- Known for: Copperplate Gothic; Goudy Old Style; Kennerley Old Style
- Spouse: Bertha Matilda Sprinks (m. 1897; died 1935)

Frederic William Goudy (/ˈɡaʊdi/ GOW-dee; March 8, 1865 – May 11, 1947) was an American printer, artist and type designer whose typefaces include Copperplate Gothic, Goudy Old Style and Kennerley. He was one of the most prolific of American type designers and his self-named type continues to be one of the most popular in America.

== Biography ==
Frederic William Goudy was born on March 8, 1865, in Bloomington, Illinois.

Goudy was not always a type designer. "At 40, this short, plump, pinkish, and puckish gentleman kept books for a Chicago realtor, and considered himself a failure. During the next 36 years, starting almost from scratch at an age when most men are permanently set in their chosen vocations, he cut 113 fonts of type, thereby creating more usable faces than did the seven greatest inventors of type and books, from Gutenberg to Garamond."

Asked how to say his name, he told The Literary Digest "When I was a boy my father spelled our name 'Gowdy' which didn't offer any particular reason for verbal gymnastics. Later learning that the old Scots spelling was 'Goudy,' he changed to that form, while I, for some years, retained the old way. My brother in Chicago still spells with the w. However, I find that occasionally a stranger pronounces the word with ou as long o in go, sometimes as ou in soup, or goo and less frequently with the ou as oo in good. I retain the original pronunciation with ou as in out."

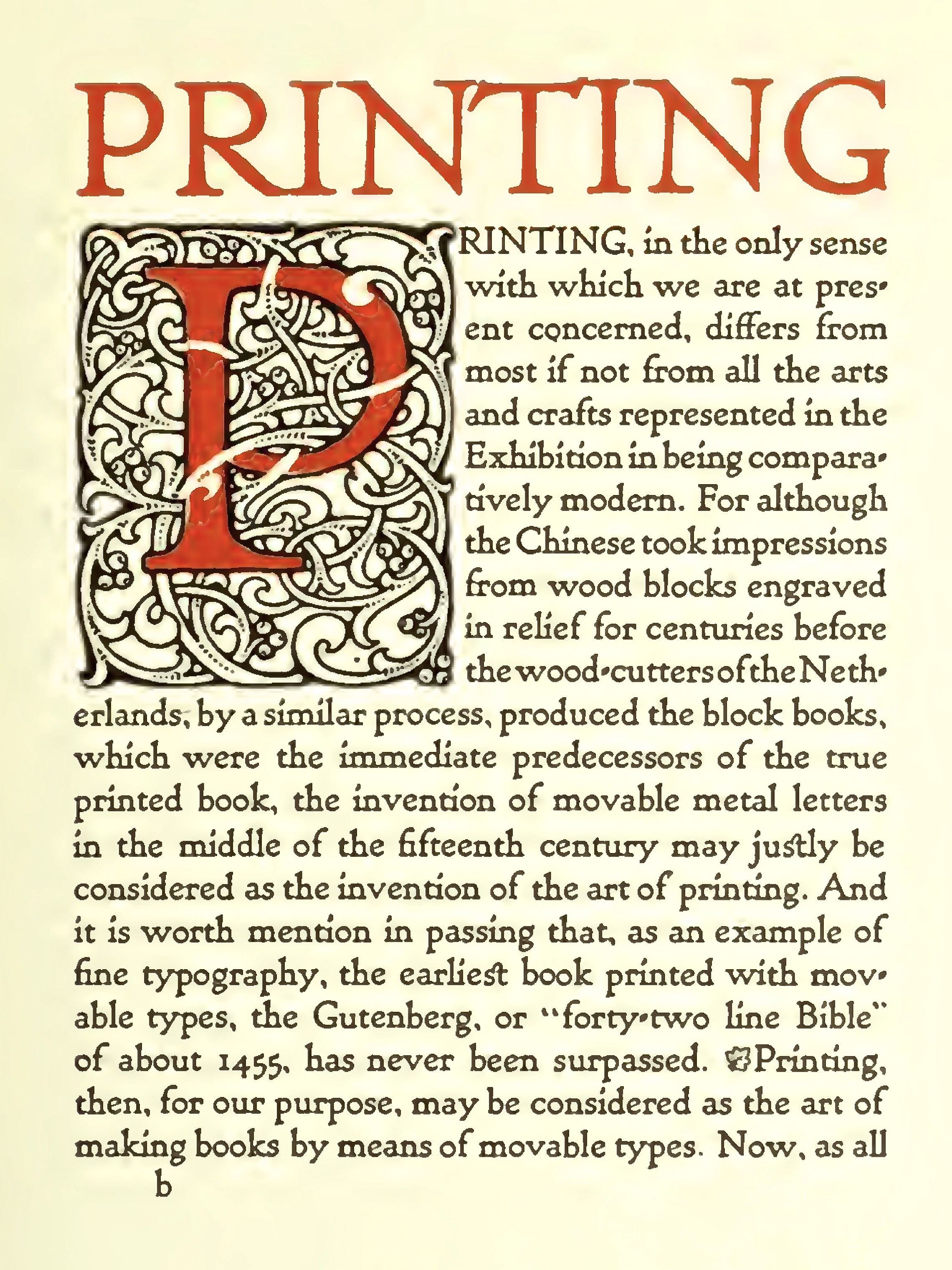
"Printing" by William Morris, as reprinted by the Village Press, run by Goudy with Will Ransom, c. 1903

After teaching lettering and becoming known as an advertising designer in Chicago, Goudy built his reputation as a type designer. In 1895 he founded his printing shop, Booklet Press (later renamed Camelot Press). Goudy designed his first typeface, Camelot, in 1896. In 1903, Goudy and Will Ransom founded the Village Press in Park Ridge, Illinois. The typeface used for the Village Press, dubbed "Village" was originally created in 1903 for the Chicago clothing manufacturer, Kuppenheimer & Company. This venture was modeled on the Arts and Crafts movement ideals of William Morris, whose Golden Type many of Goudy's earliest designs echo. It was moved to Boston, and then New York. In 1908, he created his first significant typeface for the Lanston Monotype Machine Company: E-38, sometimes known as Goudy Light. However, in that same year the Village Press burned to the ground, destroying all of his equipment and designs. In 1911, Goudy produced his first "hit", Kennerley Old Style, for an H. G. Wells anthology published by Mitchell Kennerley. This success was followed by Goudy's release of the titling letter Forum. Both Kennerley and Forum were cut for private use. Although Goudy was one of the first type designers to become established without working for a foundry, the American Type Founders Company (ATF) became interested in Goudy after his release of Kennerley and Forum. ATF commissioned Goudy to create a typeface. Goudy agreed "on the condition that his original drawings would not be subjected to interference by the founder's drawing room". This commission would become Goudy Old Style. Goudy Old Style was released in 1915 and became an instant success. (cite) It was well suited for newspaper's advertising sections because of its efficient use of space. ATF continued to expand the Goudy 'family' to Goudy Title in 1917, Goudy Bold in 1920, Goudy Catalogue in 1921, Goudy Handtooled in 1922 and Goudy Extrabold in 1927. Goudy types were clearly very lucrative for ATF, but Goudy did not receive anything because he had sold his original design for $1,500 instead of entering into a royalty agreement. ATF's refusal to give Goudy compensation for the success of the Goudy family led to the deterioration of Goudy's relationship with ATF. The only other typefaces Goudy designed for ATF was Goudytype, and series of initial letters, named Cloister Initials.

From 1920 to 1947, Goudy was art director for Lanston Monotype. Although he continued to design for Monotype throughout this period, Goudy withdrew to his workshop in Marlborough, New York, which he dubbed the Village Letter Foundery. Goudy withdrew partly because he believed that the methods the Monotype firm used to transfer his designs to matrices compromised his work. "All of Goudy's types were drawn freehand, without the use of compass, straightedge or French curve."(cite) It was at the Village Letter Foundery (his workshop) that Goudy created the majority of his prolific work. In 1939, the Village Letter Foundery was destroyed by fire and much of his work was lost. Two of his most successful designs created for Monotype, Deepdene and Goudy Text, were not destroyed. Beginning in 1927, Goudy was a vice-president of the Continental Type Founders Association, which distributed many of his faces.

Goudy was widely known from 1915 to 1940 mainly because of the success of his typefaces, but also because he gave many lectures and speeches on "the great love he had for letter forms". Goudy was known to rarely turn down a speaking engagement. In 1940 he was appointed lecturer at Syracuse University's S. I. Newhouse School of Public Communications. An excerpt from a lecture he gave to the annual convention of the International Club of Printing House Craftsmen in New York in 1939 highlights Goudy's practicality and love for letterform. "My craft is a simple one. For nearly forty years I have endeavored constantly to create a greater and more general esteem for good printing and typography, to give printers and reader of print more legible and more beautiful types than were hitherto available." By the end of his life, Goudy had designed 122 typefaces and published 59 literary works. He worked extensively with his wife Bertha M. Goudy, who particularly collaborated with him on printing projects in which she acted as a compositor of type. The couple had a son, Frederic T. Goudy.

It has been claimed that Goudy was the originator of the well-known statement, "Anyone who would letterspace lowercase would steal sheep."

== Typefaces ==
Specimens of typefaces designed by Frederic Goudy

Goudy was the third most prolific designer of metal type in the United States (behind Morris Fuller Benton and R. Hunter Middleton), with ninety faces actually cut and cast, and many more designs completed. His most famous were Copperplate Gothic and Goudy Old Style. Besides printing, he also worked on numerous hand-lettering projects (especially early in his career) and created a large set of ampersands for an article on the topic.

Goudy's career was influenced by the Arts and Crafts movement and the growth of fine book printing in the United States. At a time when printing types had become quite mechanical and geometric under the influence of Didone designs such as Bodoni, Goudy spent his career developing old-style serifs often influenced by the printing of the Italian Renaissance and calligraphy, with a characteristic warmth and irregularity. His neighbour, Eric Sloane, recalled that he also took inspiration from hand-painted signs. In contrast to his great contemporary Morris Fuller Benton, he generally avoided sans-serif designs, though he did create the nearly sans-serif Copperplate Gothic, inspired by engraved letters, early in his career and a few others later. As a result, many of his designs may look quite similar to modern readers. He also developed a number of typefaces influenced by blackletter medieval manuscripts, illuminated manuscript capitals and Roman capitals engraved in stone. Some of his most famous designs such as Copperplate Gothic and Goudy Stout are unusual deviations from his normal style. His sans-serif series, Goudy Sans, adopts an eccentric humanist style with a calligraphic italic. Quite unlike most sans-serif types of the period, it was unpopular in his lifetime but revived several times since.

As an independent artist and consultant, Goudy needed to undertake a large range of commissions to survive, and sought patronage from companies who would commission a typeface for their own printing and advertising. This led to him producing a large range of designs on commission, and promoting his career through talks and teaching. As a result, many of his designs may look quite similar to modern readers. His career was aided by the new pantograph engraving technology, which made it easier to rapidly cut the matrices used as moulds to form metal type. This was a considerable advance on the traditional method of cutting punches manually at the size of the letter to be printed, which would be stamped into metal to form the matrix. An additional boon to his career was the new hot metal typesetting technology of the period which created increasing availability and demand for new fonts.

While most of his designs are 'old-style' serif faces, they do still explore a wide range of aspects of the genre, with Deepdene offering a strikingly upright italic, Goudy Modern merging traditional old-style letters with the insistent, horizontal serifs of Didone faces of the eighteenth and nineteenth centuries and Goudy Old Style being sold with a swash italic for display use. Goudy kept records of his work (though most of these do not survive due to the fire), giving his typefaces numbers for his own use in a similar way to the opus numbers used by composers. Almost uniquely for type designers of the metal type era, he wrote extensively on his work, including a thorough commentary on each of his designs late in life.

The printer Daniel Berkeley Updike, while respecting some of his work (at least publicly), echoed Goudy's student Dwiggins' comment that his work lacked 'a certain snap and acidity', and apparently somewhat snobbishly disliked Goudy's aggressive seeking after work and reputation. (Note: Dwiggins was referring to Goudy Old Style in particular: "Goudy Old Style may be said to be one hundred per cent good in the design of individual letters. When composed in a body, the characters, individually graceful, set up a whirling sensation that detracts somewhat from legibility. That is to say, the curves are perhaps too soft and round, and they lack a certain snap and acidity. The color of the face is excellent. The capitals, when used alone, compose into a strong and dignified line.") He also wrote that Goudy had "never gotten over" a desire to imitate medieval books. The British printer Stanley Morison, also a veteran of fine book printing whose career at Monotype had moved in the direction of blending tradition with practicality, admired much of Goudy's work and ethos but also wrote sarcastically in private letters to Updike that Goudy had "designed a whole century of very peculiar looking types", and that he was glad that his company's Times New Roman did not look "as if it has been designed by somebody in particular – Mr. Goudy for instance." Goudy felt in his later life that his career had been overshadowed by new trends, with modernism and a trend towards sharper geometric design making his work out of favor. Walter Tracy described Goudy as "over-fond" of the 'e' with a tilted centre common in fifteenth-century printing which he felt added an "unwanted restlessness" to many of his type designs.

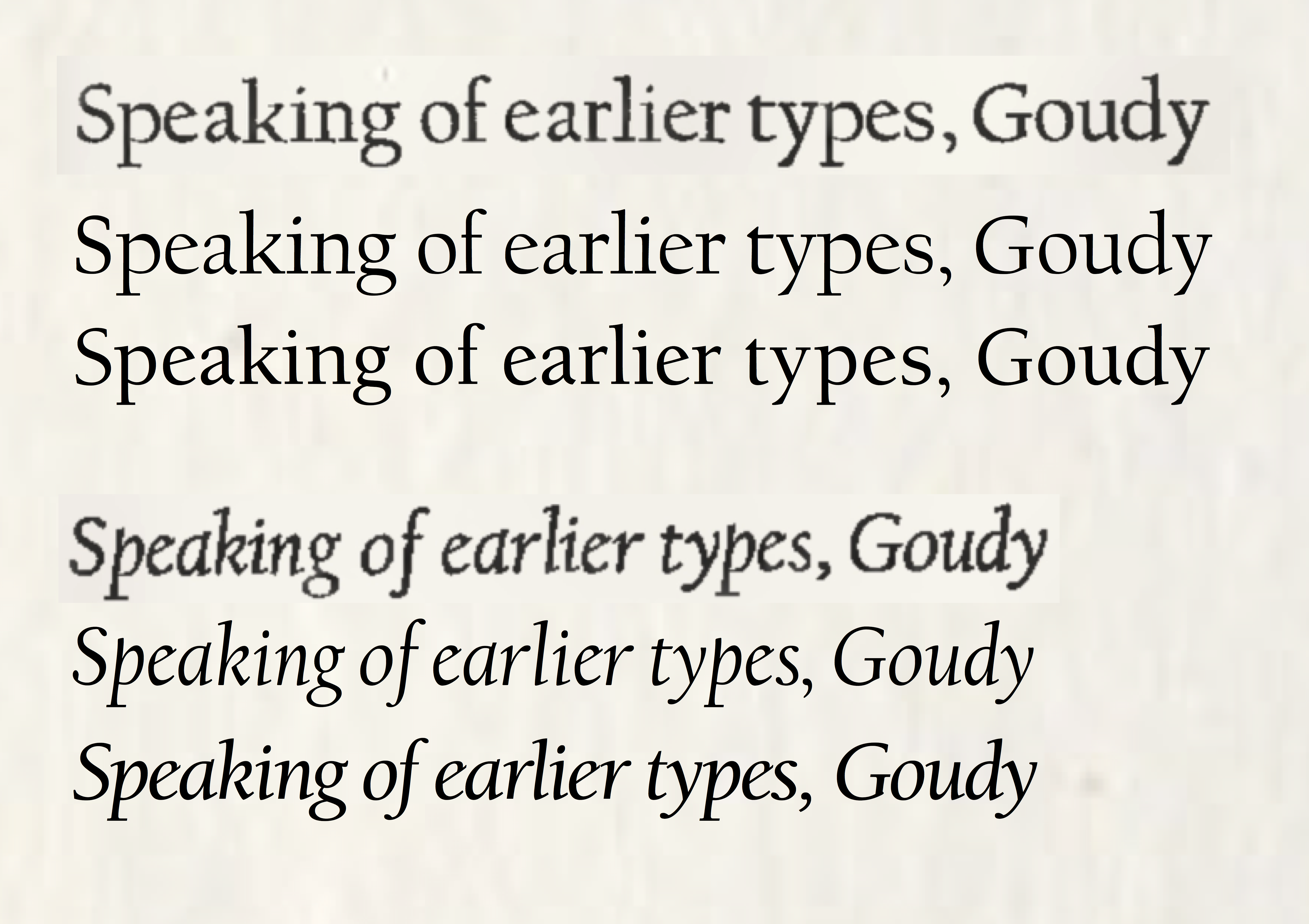
University of California Old Style in regular and italic styles, compared to two digitisations: Californian FB and Berkeley Old Style Medium.

In 1938 he designed University of California Old Style, for the sole proprietary use of the University of California Press. The Lanston Monotype Company released a version of this typeface as Californian for wider distribution in 1956, while ITC created a well-known adaptation (and expansion) called Berkeley Old Style or ITC Berkeley, in 1983.

William T. LaMoy, a curator at Syracuse University, discovered two sets of matrices (metal molds) and associated paperwork in Syracuse University Library's archives for a font known as Sherman, which the publisher Frederic Fairchild Sherman had commissioned from Goudy in 1910. LaMoy published an article about this discovery in 2013, explaining how, in the 1960s, Sherman's niece bequeathed the font to Syracuse University because she was aware of Goudy's connection to the university. Indeed, in 1934, Syracuse University had awarded Goudy an honorary degree and, from the journalism school, a typographic medal for excellence. Recently Syracuse University adopted and digitized the Sherman typeface and is now using it for official publications. Called the Sherman Serif Book, it is a proprietary font for Syracuse University.

== Legacy ==
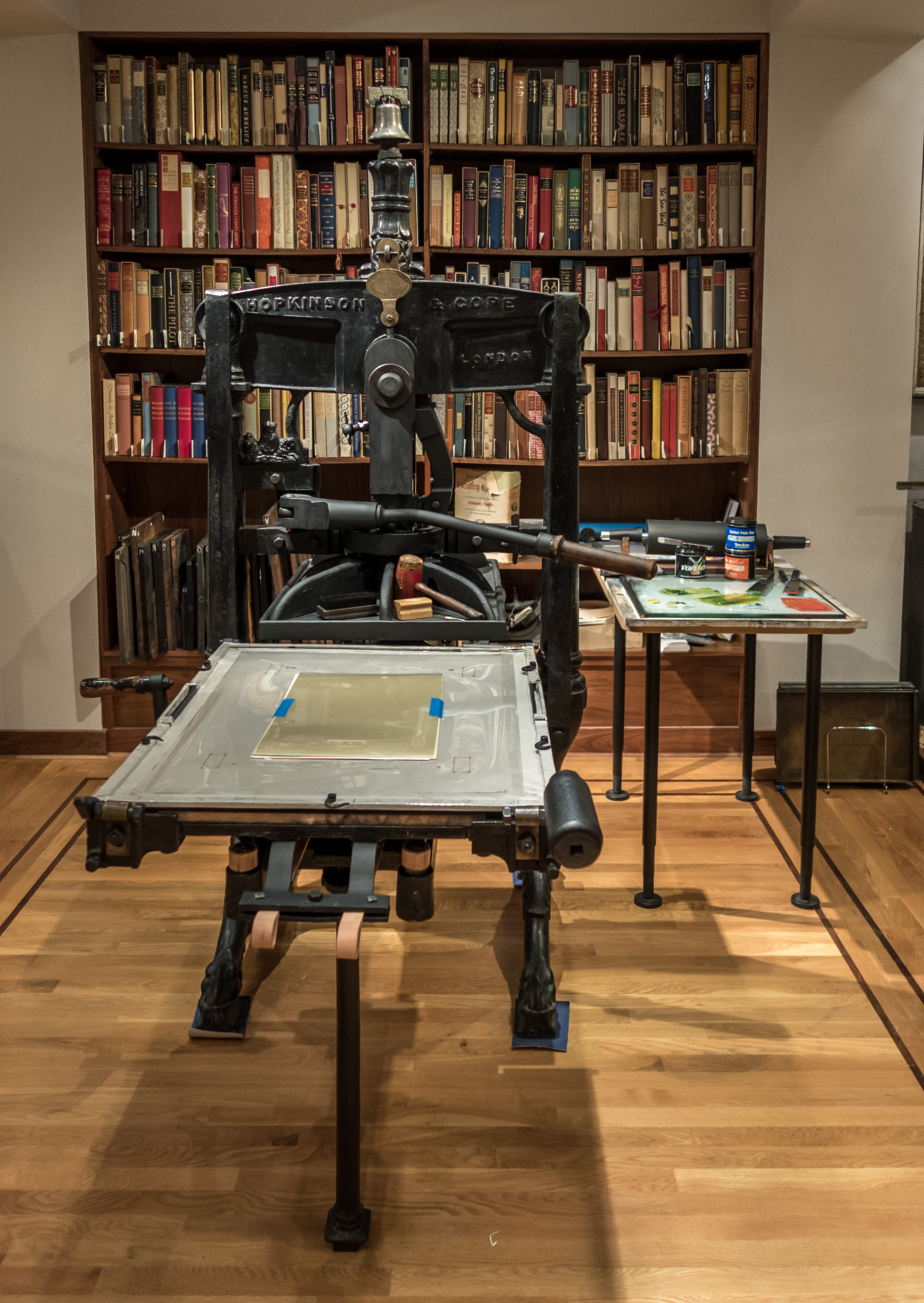
Albion Press no. 6551

The Cary Graphic Arts Collection, a rare book library and archive at the Rochester Institute of Technology, sponsors the Frederic W. Goudy Award. It is awarded annually to outstanding practitioners in the field of typography, including previous recipients Hermann Zapf, Ed Benguiat, and Kris Holmes.

The Cary Collection also houses the Albion iron hand press No. 6551—or the "Kelmscott/Goudy Press," so named because it was first owned by William Morris, then later by Frederic Goudy. The press is on permanent display at the Cary Collection and is preserved through active use in classes, workshops, and other activities.

Several type designs have been reinterpreted by the type designer Steve Matteson based on his love of Goudy’s work.

== External links and books ==
=== Writings by Goudy ===
- "A half-century of type design and typography:" volumes 1 and 2, The Typophiles, New York, 1946. A complete list of Goudy's type designs with commentary.
- "The Alphabet: Fifteen Interpretive Designs" Mitchell Kennerley, N.Y.C, 1918. (alternative digitisation)
- Elements of Lettering (with Bertha Goudy), Mitchell Kennerley, N.Y.C, 1922
- Hello To Those Who Retain Their Sanity, essay, Monotype magazine, 1928
- Ars Typographisch, (Vol. 1, No. 4, 1934): an occasional journal guest-edited by Goudy for one issue in 1934. Contains Goudy's article Type Design: A Homily
- "The Trajan Capitals," Oxford University Press, New York, 1936
- "Typologia" University of California Press, Berkeley, Los Angeles, London, 1940

=== Books printed by Goudy ===
- Oh, what a plague is love!, Katharine Tynan, 1900 (published by A. C. McClurg & Co., designed by Goudy)
- The Cobbler of Nîme, Mary Imlay Taylor, 1900
- Printing, William Morris, 1903
- Songs and verses selected from the works of Edmund Waller, 1911
- Verses by Henry Goelet McVickar, 1911
- Why we have chosen Forest Hills Gardens for our home, 1915

=== Further reading ===
- Boone, Andrew R. Type By Goudy (Popular Mechanics, April 1942. Many pictures of Goudy at work.)
- Bruckner, D.J.R., "Frederic Goudy," Documents of American Design series, Harry N. Abrams, Inc., Publishers, New York City, 1990, ISBN 0-8109-1035-7.
- Frederic Goudy – Pantagraph (Bloomington, IL newspaper)
- Frederick Goudy at Typophile
- Goudy type designs at Lanston Type Co.
- Lewis, Bernard: Behind the Type: The Life Story of Frederic W. Goudy, Carnegie Institute of Technology, 1941. An extensive survey of Goudy's work. Goudy's 1938 talk on printing, The Ethics and Aesthetics of Type, is printed at the end.
- Linotype Library Designers: Frederic W. Goudy
- MacGrew, Mac, "American Metal Typefaces of the Twentieth Century," Oak Knoll Books, New Castle Delaware, 1993, ISBN 0-938768-34-4.
- Orton, Vrest "Goudy, Master of Letters", Black Cat Press, Chicago, 1939. A festschrift with an introduction by Goudy.
- Rollins, Carl Purlington "American Type Designers and Their Work" in Print, V. 4, #1.
- Typographer's Digest, No. 27 (1967): issue dedicated to Goudy's memory. Collects some of Goudy's more obscure writings and fonts, which are shown in a sample at the end.

=== Primary sources ===
- Frederic W. Goudy Collection, Ball State University Libraries, Archives and Special Collections (PDF)
- Frederic W. Goudy Collection, Library of Congress Rare Book and Special Collections Division
- Frederic W. Goudy Collection, McLean County Museum of History archives
- Frederic W. Goudy Collection, Syracuse University Special Collections Research Center
- Charles E. Pont Collection relating to Frederic Goudy, Syracuse University Special Collections Research Center
- Frederic W. Goudy Collection, McLean County Museum of History
- Frederic W. Goudy Collection, Cary Graphic Arts Collection, Rochester Institute of Technology
