= Lattingtown Baptist Church =

Historic church in New York, United States

- U.S. National Register of Historic Places
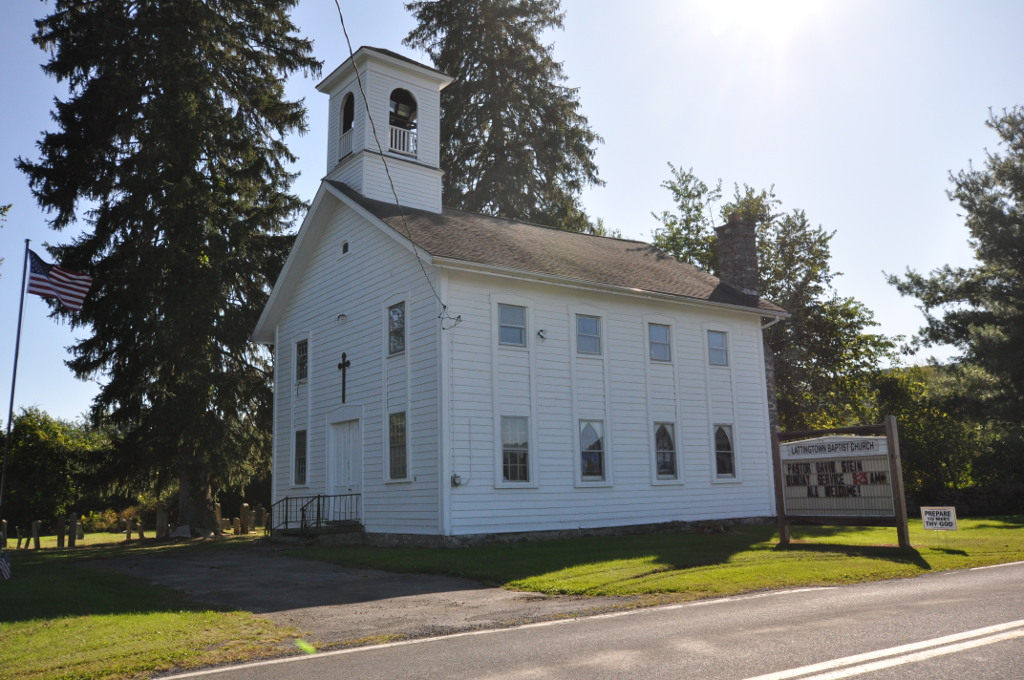

- Location within New York Location within the United States
- Location: 425 Old Indian Road, Lattingtown, New York
- Coordinates: 41°38′39″N 74°0′4″W
- Area: less than one acre
- Built: c. 1810
- Architectural style: Federal
- NRHP reference No.: 10000855
- Added to NRHP: October 20, 2010

Lattingtown Baptist Church is a historic Baptist church located at Lattintown, Ulster County, New York. The meeting house form building was built about 1810 during the Federal period. It is a two-story, heavy timber-frame structure with queen post and purlin roof framing. It was extensively renovated during the 19th century to add an eclectic blend of Gothic and picturesque-inspired elements. Also on the property is the church cemetery, with burials dating to 1817; privy; and stone walls.

It was listed on the National Register of Historic Places in 2010.
