= University of California Old Style =

1938 serif typeface by Frederic Goudy

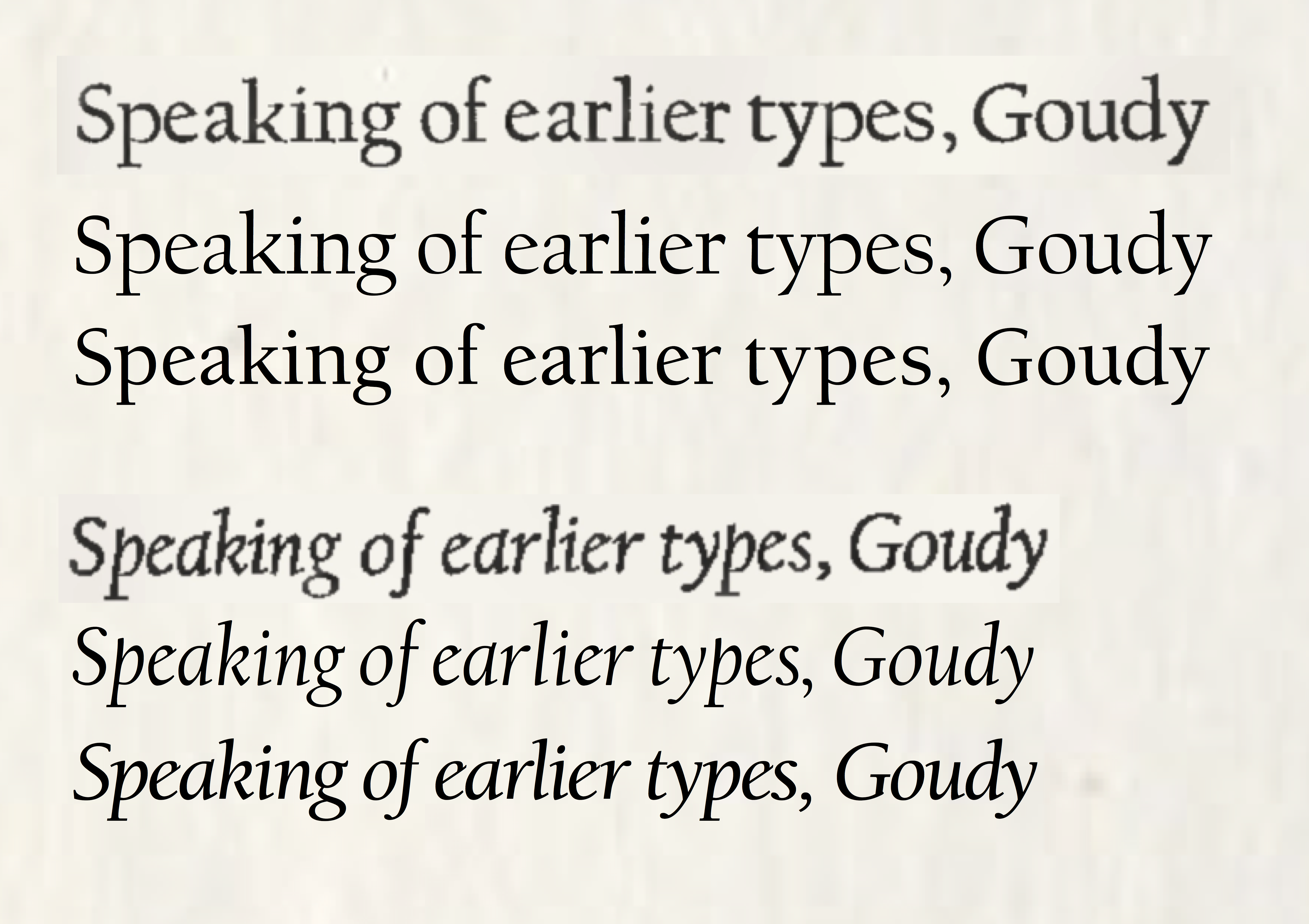
- Category: Serif
- Classification: Old-style
- Designer: Frederic Goudy
- Date created: 1936–38
- Shown here: University of California Old Style metal type in regular and italic styles, compared to two digitizations: Californian FB and ITC Berkeley Old Style Medium.

University of California Old Style is a serif typeface designed by Frederic Goudy and created for the University of California Press from 1936–38. It is one of Goudy's most popular serif typefaces. It is also known as Berkeley Old Style and Californian.

The University of California is an 'old-style' serif typeface, one inspired by the styles of printing popular before the late eighteenth century. Goudy described it as particularly inspired by the 'Fell Types', a collection of 1670s typefaces used by Oxford University Press, while other details such as the tilted cross-stroke of the 'e' recall what is now called the 'Venetian' style of typeface design, used by printers such as Nicolas Jenson up to the 1490s. Intended for fine book printing, the design has a delicate grace and strokes that alternate between thick and thin. Serifs are fine slabs with minimal bracketing. Goudy provided a set of swash capitals as alternates for the italic.

Like many of Goudy's other families, it has been re-released and made generally available after his death, under a variety of (often shorter) names. While no longer the corporate typeface of the University of California Press, it retains a strong popularity in academia and is used as a corporate typeface by several universities.

== Creation ==
Goudy used the font to set his book Typologia (1940) which was printed by the University of California Press in the new font, and he described his inspiration for it in the chapter The Story of a Type. He described it as particularly intended to be attractive in mass and said that the italic was intended to be "a refined letter, yet not, I hope, one which may be called prudish…some letters are a bit exuberant. As an italic is [mostly used] to emphasize a word…or sometimes merely to give a lighter touch, I have allowed myself to incorporate here and there in my font some forms more or less fanciful." It was finished just before a fire that destroyed Goudy's workshop, engraving machine and plan drawings, and Goudy noted in his book that it was lucky that he had posted off finished work to Monotype to use as a basis for making punches for their hot metal typesetting system, allowing some letters to be redrawn from patterns.

Goudy created the design from a position of great eminence as one of the most popular typeface designers of the first half of the twentieth century, and almost uniquely for type founders of the period as an independent artisan, not employed by any one company and free to pursue his own projects. However, tastes were changing away from his work even at the time he was commissioned by the University Press. Contemporary trends in graphic design saw a movement away from Goudy's love of warm, organic and rounded serif fonts, in favor crisper designs, such as sharp geometric sans-serif fonts and harder, more robust serifs such as Monotype's Times New Roman. Of his more than a hundred fonts designed (counting regular or roman fonts and italics separately), it would be his last—but two creation of a roman and italic. Goudy had high ambitions for his design, and wrote to California that "I'm trying hard to make it a magnum opus and maybe the effort is preventing more rapid progress – maybe magnum opuses aren't made so consciously."

Walter Tracy in his book Letters of Credit was unimpressed with the design, commenting "the design is not particularly notable, but it is pleasant enough to read at 12 point and smaller...in the larger sizes some peculiarities show themselves: C, E, F and T look unfinished, s is too light, and in italic the ball terminals in s look at odds with the other capitals, though they are acceptable in the lowercase s."

== Naming ==
For a name, Goudy preferred 'Berkeley' after the press's location, which, he thought more 'aristocratic' than the alternative proposal of 'Californian'. However, Samuel Farquhar, the University Press's manager, requested a name change in order to avoid associating its name with just one of the university system's campuses. Both the proposed alternatives would later be used by rereleases.

== Public use ==
After the original type was commissioned for private use, 'California' was released publicly by different companies, first in 1958, by Lanston Monotype as 'Californian' and then under the name of 'Berkeley Old Style' by ITC. Both these versions have been digitized.

== Digitizations ==
In digital versions, ITC released Berkeley Old Style under its pre-existing name. Digital versions were also issued as 'Californian' by Font Bureau (included with some versions of Microsoft Office and by LTC (in different digitizations) and by Richard Beatty under the name of 'University Old Style'. Most of these versions added a bold type, which Goudy did not design himself. Font Bureau added a more delicate optical size for display use.

== Academic use ==
Although no longer the corporate font of the University of California Press or System, Goudy's font remains popular in academic use. As of 2022, it remains a corporate font of the Iowa State University; it is also used on the UC Berkeley word mark.
