= The Fleuron =

The Fleuron was a British journal of typography and book arts published in seven volumes from 1923 to 1930. A fleuron is a floral ornament used by typographers.

In 1922 Stanley Morison — the influential typographical advisor to Monotype — together with Francis Meynell, Holbrook Jackson, Bernard Newdigate and Oliver Simon, founded the Fleuron Society in London. The Fleuron was the Fleuron Society's journal of typography and it was produced in seven lavish volumes. Each volume contained a rich variety of papers, illustrations, specimens, inserts and facsimiles along with essays by leading writers of typography and the book arts. The Fleuron is significant in containing influential essays and typographic material still relevant to the history and use of typeface.

The Fleuron is also significant as one of a series of British typographic journals embodied in diverse formats and titles: the Monotype Recorder, Signature (typography journal) (1935–1940 and 1946–1954), Alphabet and Image (1946–1952), Typographica (1949–1967), Motif (1958–1967), Baseline (1979–present), Matrix (1981–2021) and Eye (1990–present).

Anthologies and reproductions of The Fleuron are also now available.

== Seven volumes ==
Following is a brief description of the seven volumes along with notable content relating to essays, contributors and typefaces.

1. Edited by Oliver Simon. London, 1923. Among other articles, this issue includes Francis Meynell & Stanley Morison Printers' flowers and Arabesques.
2. Edited by Oliver Simon. London.
3. Edited by Oliver Simon. London, 1924. This volume includes articles on the development of the book, W.A. Dwiggins, D.B. Updike and the Merrymount Press, and modern styles in music printing in England.
4. Edited by Oliver Simon. London, 1925. The fourth volume includes an essay by Frederic Warde on the work of Bruce Rogers.
5. Edited by Stanley Morison. The University Press, Cambridge, and Doubleday Page, New York, 1926. This volume includes the essay by Beatrice Warde (using the male pseudonym Paul Beaujon) on the historically inaccurate attribution of Jean Jannon's types to Claude Garamond.
6. Edited by Stanley Morison. The University Press, Cambridge, and Doubleday Page, New York, 1928. This volume includes articles on Rudolf Koch, Geofroy Tory, an essay by Beatrice Warde (under the pen name Paul Beaujon) called On Decorative Printing in America and Decorated Types by Stanley Morison.
7. Edited by Stanley Morison. The University Press, Cambridge, and Doubleday Page, New York, 1930. This volume includes specimens of Perpetua, Centaur Roman, Monotype Bembo and Lutetia. This issue contains a Beatrice Warde essay, Eric Gill: Sculptor of Letters and a complete reprinting of The Passion of Perpetua and Felicity with type and illustrations by Eric Gill. Also included is a famous essay by Stanley Morison, First Principles of Typography.
