= Modern typography =

Late 19th century unornamented style

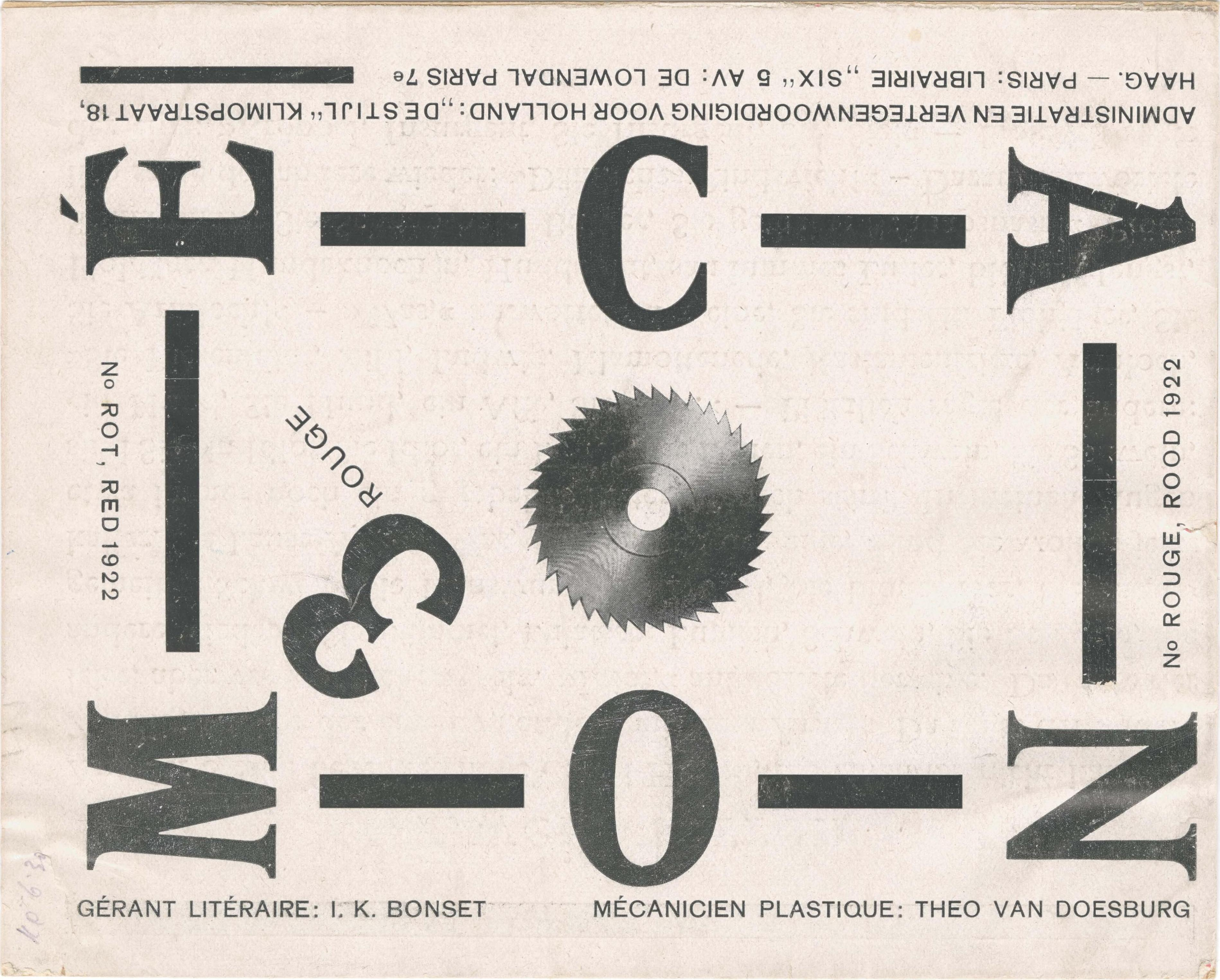
Cover of Mécano issue No. 3, 'Red'.

Modern Typography is a 1920s principle that expresses a reaction against what its proponents perceived as a decadence of typography and design emerging from the late 19th century. This amalgam consists of the foundations and overall notions of Design Concept, Typeface, Objective, Model of Vision, and its significance among readers. While it is mostly associated with the works of Jan Tschichold and Bauhaus typographers Herbert Bayer, László Moholy-Nagy, El Lissitzky and others – it is also encountered through word documents, maps, labels, and other forms related to digital use and is readable across different media.

In other words, "Typography is, in a very real sense, the basic building block on which design of primarily verbal texts relies."

Charles Kostelnick, an English professor at Iowa University, wrote an article addressing the transformation from pen to print. He goes on to shape the statement, “Text cannot exist without visual transcription, and to transcribe, to place on a physical surface, is to design” As typography ties hand-in-hand with other forms of media and design, such as the Printing Press, Kostelnick's ideology exemplifies how all the notions listed above come together to represent Modern Typography.

== Design concept ==
Modern Typography reflects a modern, universal method of communication. This design concept assumes passive, almost automatic – subconscious visual experience. It counts on the rationality of both, graphic design and production of the message as well as the audience that is receiving. It features high contrast, thin strokes, and long or no serifs– for example, Times New Roman font.

When considering the perspective of the reader, the act of perception involved is the simple act of seeing; the reader is passive, detached and objective. The goal is to effectively communicate a message while still enhancing readability and evoking a certain tone or appearance to the reader. Aiming to be legible, clear and authentic– both the reader and the text, in other words, the verbal and visual elements, simultaneously come together to help shape our understanding of whatever needs to be consumed.

"[Typographic style and layout] do not obstruct the transmission of meaning." Jan Tschichold codified the principles of modern typography in his 1928 book, New Typography. He later repudiated the philosophy he espoused in this book as being fascistic, but it remained very influential.

== Typeface ==
Typeface remains the groundwork for design concepts. The hallmark of early modern typography is the sans-serif typeface. "Because of its simplicity, the even weight of its lines, and its nicely balanced proportions, sans serif forms pleasing and easily distinguished word patterns – a most important element in legibility and easy reading." This legibility and easy readability standard remains a top priority when it comes to Modern Typography.

The essence of Modern Typography was for its visible form to be developed out of the functions of the text. sans-serif follows common typeface conventions such as establishing tone and personality, enhancing readability and comprehension, conveying specific emotions, and helping various brands, assignments, and/or courses of action to build their brand identity; all while competing to remain appealing to readers and viewers.

== Objective ==
Modern Typography's first objective is to develop visible form out of the functions of the text. The goal is to take ideas, concepts, and verbal usage and transform them into something perceptible.

For modernist designers, it is essential to give pure and direct expression to the contents of whatever is printed: "Just as in the works of technology and nature, 'form' must be created out of function. Only then can we achieve typography that expresses the spirit of modern man. The function of printed text is communication, emphasis (word value), and the logical sequence of the contents". Indicating that modernist expression is to communicate content logically by emphasizing key details through hierarchical information. Asymmetrical layouts and Sans-serif typefaces were used as effective ways to organize information to clearly communicate. This prompted contemporary printers to order elements on a geometric grid for printing. This would later influence the Swiss style, also known as the International style typography.

With the combination of typeface and typography, and in this case, in terms of modernity, modernists in general use these aspects to force clearer ideas upon viewers in expressive ways. "The trend in modern typography is definitely toward simplicity and legibility, employing forms that comply with the natural inclination of the human eye to seek harmony and ease." This not only aesthetically engages the reader/viewer but displays communication in an effective, comprehensible manner.

== Model of vision ==
Modern interpretation of the message assumes objectivity and neutrality. Graphic design, processed through print technology, translates problems and experiences into a visual linear order. There is a single point of view. The designer believes that he/she should control what would be seen. This model of vision rejects interplay between a viewer and image and affirms that our internal makeup does not alter the impressions we receive. The modern designer's objective is to control the viewer's detached visual component so that information is transmitted seamlessly.

In attempting to control the eye, modern design dismissed the creativity of viewing. Beatrice Warde wrote a famous article about rules for typography in modern print in 1932. According to her everything about a 'container' is "calculated to reveal and not to hide the beautiful thing which it was meant to contain." To make a good choice of typography for a modernist designer is not a question of "How should it look?" but "What must it do?" B. Ward pushes to the extreme when she says, "type well used is invisible as type." She denies artistic quality to the printed piece because in her opinion that would mean that its mission is the expression of the designer's self, and not fulfillment of its primary function – conveying the message. These statements are in line with modernist simplicity of Bauhaus, Constructivism, Futurism and their claim that typography, like architecture, must be functional.

Importantly enough, as designers control what is seen and incorporate delivery with design, sculpting an end product, Modern Typography similarly represents many aspects of print culture and general typography in encouraging some senses of noetic culture, situating utterance, and suggesting self-containment – what readers desire in simple comprehension and visual rhetoric.

== See also ==
- Alexander Rodchenko – Russian artist and designer (1891–1956)
- De Stijl – Dutch art movement founded 1917
  - Neoplasticism – Art theory espousing pure abstraction
- Industrial Revolution – 1760–1840 agrarian to industrial era shift
- Kurt Schwitters – German artist (1887–1948)
- Piet Zwart – Dutch architect and industrial designer (1885–1977)
- Pioneers of Modern Typography – Book (pub. 1969) by Herbert Spencer
- Russian avant-garde – Russian and Soviet art movement (approx. 1890–1930)
- Victorian era – Queen Victoria's reign, 1837 to 1901
