= Curwen Press =

- Status: Defunct
- Founded: 1863
- Founder: Reverend John Curwen
- Defunct: 1984
- Country of origin: United Kingdom
- Publication types: Sheet music; books; posters; artists' prints

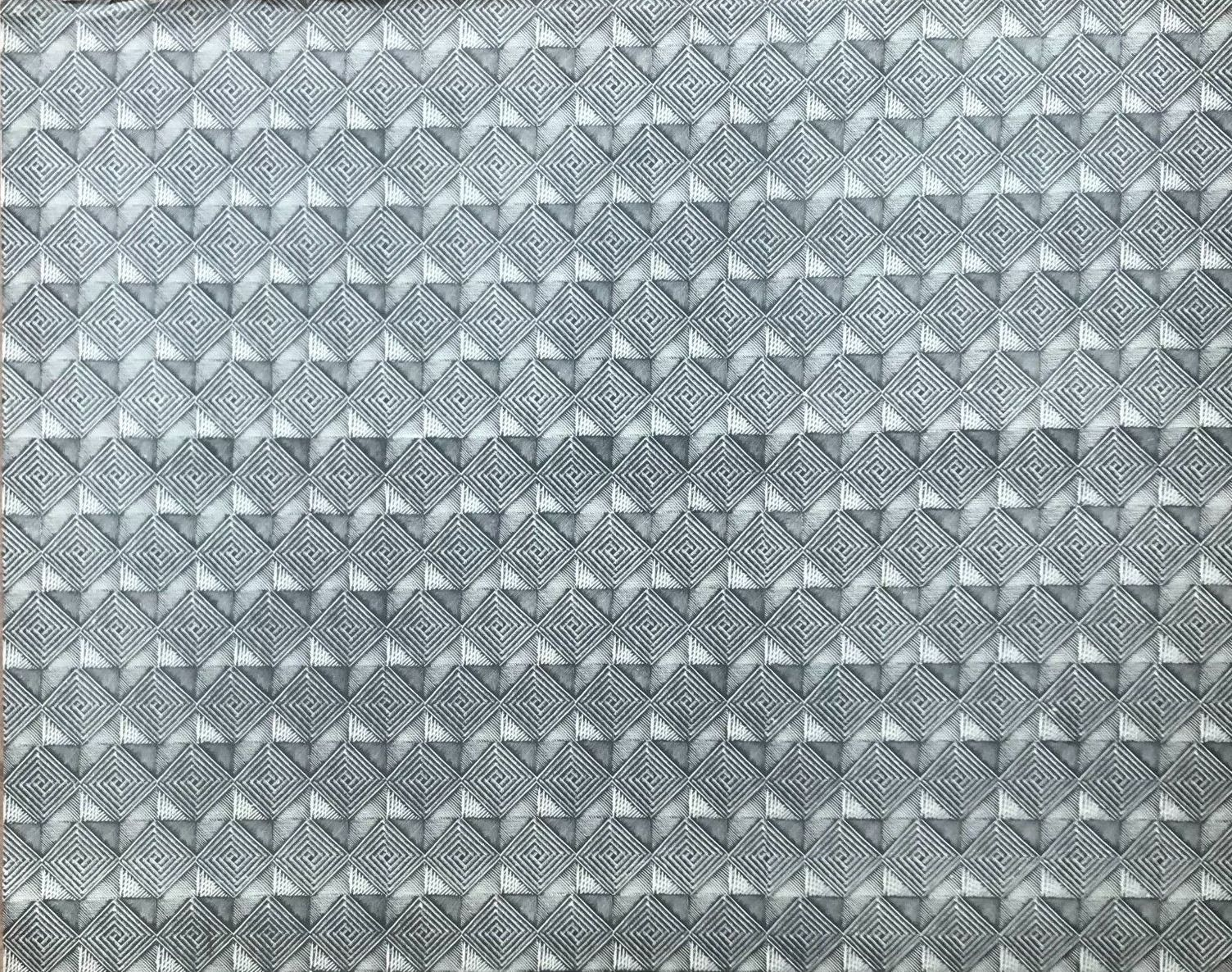
An untitled patterned paper by Althea Willoughby, for the Curwen Press, circa 1930

The Curwen Press was founded by the Reverend John Curwen in 1863 to publish sheet music for the "tonic sol-fa" system. The Press was based in Plaistow, Newham, east London, England, where Curwen was a pastor from 1844.

The Curwen Press is best known for its work in the period 1919–1939. The Press's output included books, advertising posters and published ephemera which typically used three interrelated elements: typography, decoration, and publicity which together give the Press a unique and memorable style. The work of the Press provides important evidence that the fine printing of the interwar years was not confined to private presses.

The Curwen Press, under the management of Harold Curwen, John's grandson, was at the vanguard of the design revolution that saw expression in British printing in the early 20th century. An underlying ethos of the Curwen Press was that its craftsmanship could and should take both craftsman and consumer on an emotional and aesthetic voyage. Harold Curwen considered that using contemporary independent artists would significantly enhance printed matter for publicity purposes. His belief was that the imaginative skills of an artist could not be acquired through training and gave an artist an advantage in their design work. In return that applied artist-designer would acquire something from their commercial practice to take back into their fine art.

== Decoration ==
Decoration was largely in the hands of Harold Curwen who encouraged artists such as Claud Lovat Fraser, Paul Nash, and latterly Eric Ravilious, Edward Bawden, Barnett Freedman and Enid Marx, from the same year of the Royal College of Art, to undertake work for the Press. Commissions included pattern papers, vignettes, and borders as well as illustration. While the mechanical method of printing was the way forward, Curwen believed that the imaginative artist should exert some control over how their design was being replicated and so encouraged artists to work alongside printers to learn the technical processes of illustration, particularly lithography. In this way, how the work of artists could be most effectively reproduced was balanced by how artists might render their work more sympathetic to the reproduction process. What artists themselves clearly appreciated was the preservation by Curwen of the harmony and resonance of their designs. In 1934 Curwen authored a book on processes of graphic reproduction.

== Publicity ==
Publicity material made up much of the work of the Press. This included printing advertising posters for London Transport, produced lithographically by the craftsmen of the Press from original art work. The Press also created its own publicity of which the 1931 Curwen Press Miscellany, the 1928 Specimen Book and the 1928 Book of Pattern Papers are enduring examples.

== Typography ==
A book produced to the design, and choice of material, of typographer Oliver Simon, and executed by Harold Curwen's technical team, made use of margins, typeface, spacing and materials produced a distinctive appearance associated with good quality. In 1945 Simon authored a book on his principles of typography. Simon also edited and published Signature magazine. Subtitled a Quadrimestrial of typography and the graphic arts, Signature was published between 1935–1940 and 1946–1954 (new series). Printed by the Press, Signature featured original and formative graphic work and writings by relatively new artists such as Graham Sutherland, John Piper and Eric Ravilious. It has been said that "no journal can make a greater claim to have stimulated the taste that became Neo-Romanticism", a term applied to the imaginative and often quite abstract landscape-based painting of Paul Nash, Graham Sutherland, John Piper and others in the late 1930s and 1940s. It was Simon, though Signature, who published Sutherland's new style of painting first, and the first series provided a sustained support and exposure for certain artists, most notably Sutherland, Piper, Freedman, Ravilious and Bawden.

== Branding ==
Harold Curwen pioneered several strategies that could be identified today as building a brand awareness. These included a playful use of the unicorn as a means of corporate identity at a time when the general printing industry had a very conservative approach. The creation of 'clip art' - premade images used for illustration - and the experimentation with inks that had an almost fluorescent intensity helped to define the house style of the Press. The ownership of a brand was enhanced by the Press's publication of pamphlets and books such as the Curwen Press Newsletter for customers which created a marketing dimension that was not exploited by other printers. This reinforced a house style which used newspapers and trade magazines to promote the Curwen brand.

Harold Curwen sought to instill a sense of ownership in his employees and customers through high standards in mechanical printing. An attention to detail, even in routine work, became a hallmark of the Curwen brand, as was the ability to offer clients in-house services regarding advertising and publicity.

== Music publishing ==
The original music business concentrated on choral and solo vocal music, both sacred and secular, for home, school, church or professional use. Composers published included Coleridge-Taylor, William Hurlstone, and Hugh S. Roberton, whose All in the April Evening was a big success in 1911. Many more British and European works were added to the catalogue by Granville Bantock, Rutland Boughton, Walford Davies, Marie Prentner, Beryl Price, Charles Villiers Stanford and Ralph Vaughan Williams, among others. The sheet music division regained its independence in the 1930s. J Curwen & Sons was acquired by G Schirmer Ltd in 1969 and has been part of Wise Music Group since 1986.

== Post 1939 ==
The Harold Curwen era of the Press ended just before the Second World War. Mental health difficulties led to his early retirement, although he remained in contact with the Press as shareholder and Board member until his death in 1949. Oliver Simon, who had joined the Press in 1920 went on to lead the Press on Harold Curwen's retirement.

The Press was bombed several times during the Second World War, and the building was rebuilt substantially after the war. The store of lithographic plates was destroyed in the Blitz.

On Oliver Simon's death in 1956 the chairmanship passed to Herbert (Bobby) Simon, Oliver's younger brother, who had joined the Press in 1933.

In 1958 Herbert established the Curwen Studio, under the technical management of Stanley Jones. The studio was set up as permanent professional studio to provide both artists and publishers with facilities that were pioneering and long overdue in Britain at that time. It supported an era of British avant-garde printmaking that lasted decades, and further cemented the Curwen name as synonymous with fine art and printing. Due to Simon's encouragement and commissioning of a broad range of artists to produce lithographs, the Studio maintained the hand-drawn creativity which the Curwen Press had displayed between the wars. Artists included sculptors such as Elizabeth Frink, Barbara Hepworth and Henry Moore, alongside a new younger generation of who wanted to explore the medium which Harold Curwen had championed decades earlier.

The general story of the Curwen Press is told in Herbert Simon's book: Song and Words. In 1977, the Tate Gallery held an exhibition called Artists at Curwen: A Celebration of the Gift of Artists' Prints from the Curwen Studio.

The Curwen Press closed in 1984. The site was redeveloped and a nearby primary school maintains the Curwen name. The Curwen Studio survives as an independent studio and as the Curwen Print Study Centre.
