= Mitchell Kennerley =

American writer and publisher

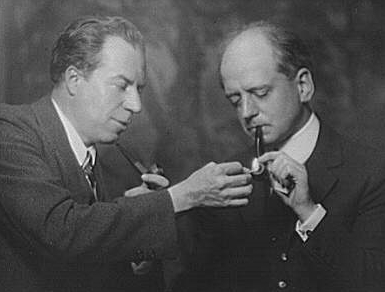
- Christopher Morley and Mitchell Kennerley in 1930
- Born: August 14, 1878; Burslem, England
- Died: February 22, 1950 (aged 71); New York City, US
- Known for: Publishing
- Spouse: Helen Rockwell Morley

Mitchell Kennerley (August 14, 1878 – February 22, 1950) was an English born American publisher, editor, and gallery owner.

== Life ==
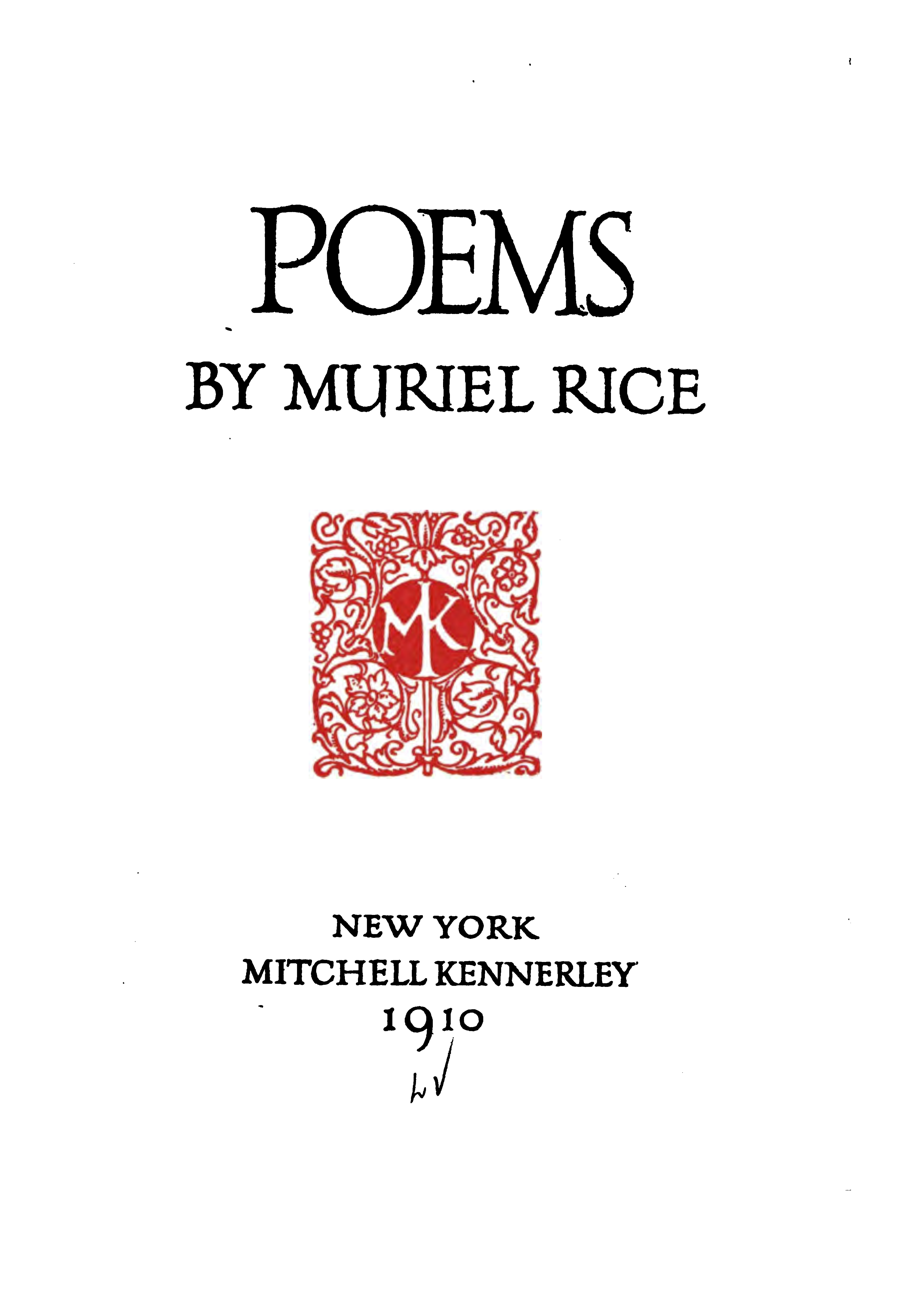
Title page of an edition of poetry printed by Mitchell Kennerly in 1910

He was born at Burslem, England.

He was the manager of the New York branch of John Lane, the London publisher, from 1896 to 1900, business manager of the Smart Set in 1900–01, founded in 1901 and was editor and proprietor until 1905 of the Reader magazine.

He married Helen Rockwell Morley. In 1906, he started in the book publishing business. He used typesetter Frederic W. Goudy for his books, and advanced him money to complete one of his first successful fonts, which Goudy named Kennerley Old Style as a dedication.

In 1910, he undertook the publication of The Forum and of The Papyrus (the later for author Michael Monahan). He was a dealer in and published the work of Oscar Wilde and Walt Whitman. In 1913, he was arrested, for sending an "obscene" book through the mail. That same year, Kennerly published Daniel Carson Goodman's work Hagar Revelly, a novel defended by Learned Hand in United States v. Kennerly, an early obscenity case.

In 1912, Kennerley's The Lyric Year One Hundred Poems, gave writer George Sterling 2nd place for his An Ode for the Centenary of the Birth of Robert Browning. This recognition was shared with Bertha Newberry's The Beloved, as they represented California in this anthology.

He was president of Anderson Galleries, from 1916 to 1929. In 1937-1938 he co-founded Parke-Bernet Galleries.

== Death and legacy ==
Kennerley died in New York City at age 71.

His papers are held at the New York Public Library, and Vassar College.

== Bibliography ==
- Bruccoli, Matthew J., The Fortunes of Mitchell Kennerley, Bookman; 1986, Harcourt, Brace Jovanovich ISBN 0-15-132671-1
