= Bertha M. Goudy =

American typographer (1869–1935)

Bertha M. Sprinks Goudy
- Born: Bertha Matilda Sprinks; September 6, 1869; Jersey City, New Jersey
- Died: October 21, 1935 (aged 66); Marlborough, New York
- Known for: Typography, Fine printing, Typesetting
- Notable work: Frankenstein (Limited Editions Club, 1934); Morris, William, Emery Walker. Printing: An Essay (Village Press, 1903); Goudy, Frederic W. The Alphabet (Village Press, 1922)
- Spouse: Frederic W. Goudy (m. 1897)

Bertha Matilda Sprinks Goudy (September 6, 1869 – October 21, 1935) was an American typographer, fine press printer, and co-proprietor with Frederic Goudy of the Village Press from 1903 until her death in 1935.

== Early life ==
Bertha Matilda Sprinks was born September 6, 1869, in Jersey City, New Jersey. She was employed as a bookkeeper in Chicago at the office of the financial broker Richard Coe Allen, where she met Frederic W. Goudy in 1890. They were married on June 2, 1897, in Berwyn, Illinois.

== Career ==
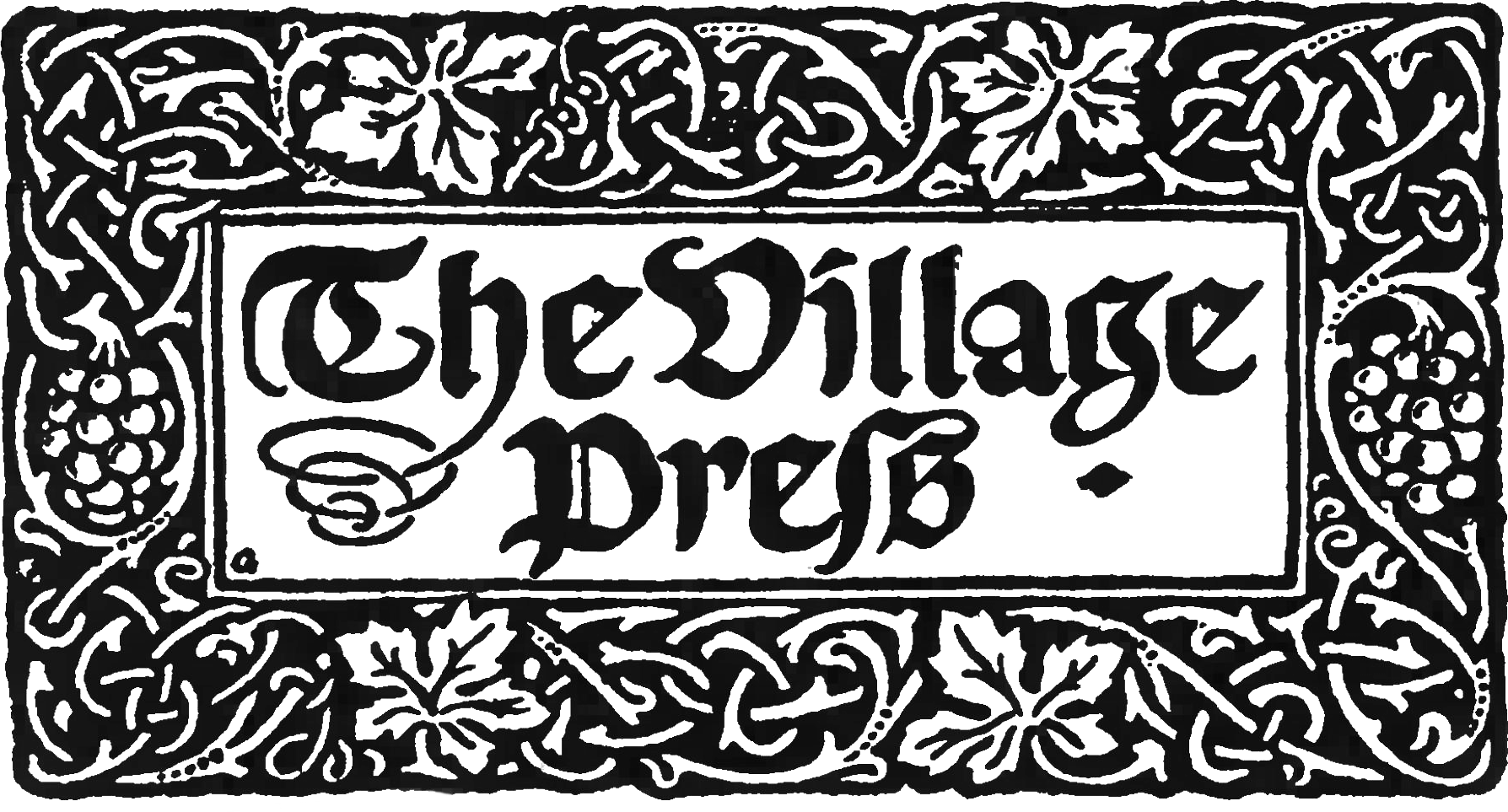
Village Press mark, 1904

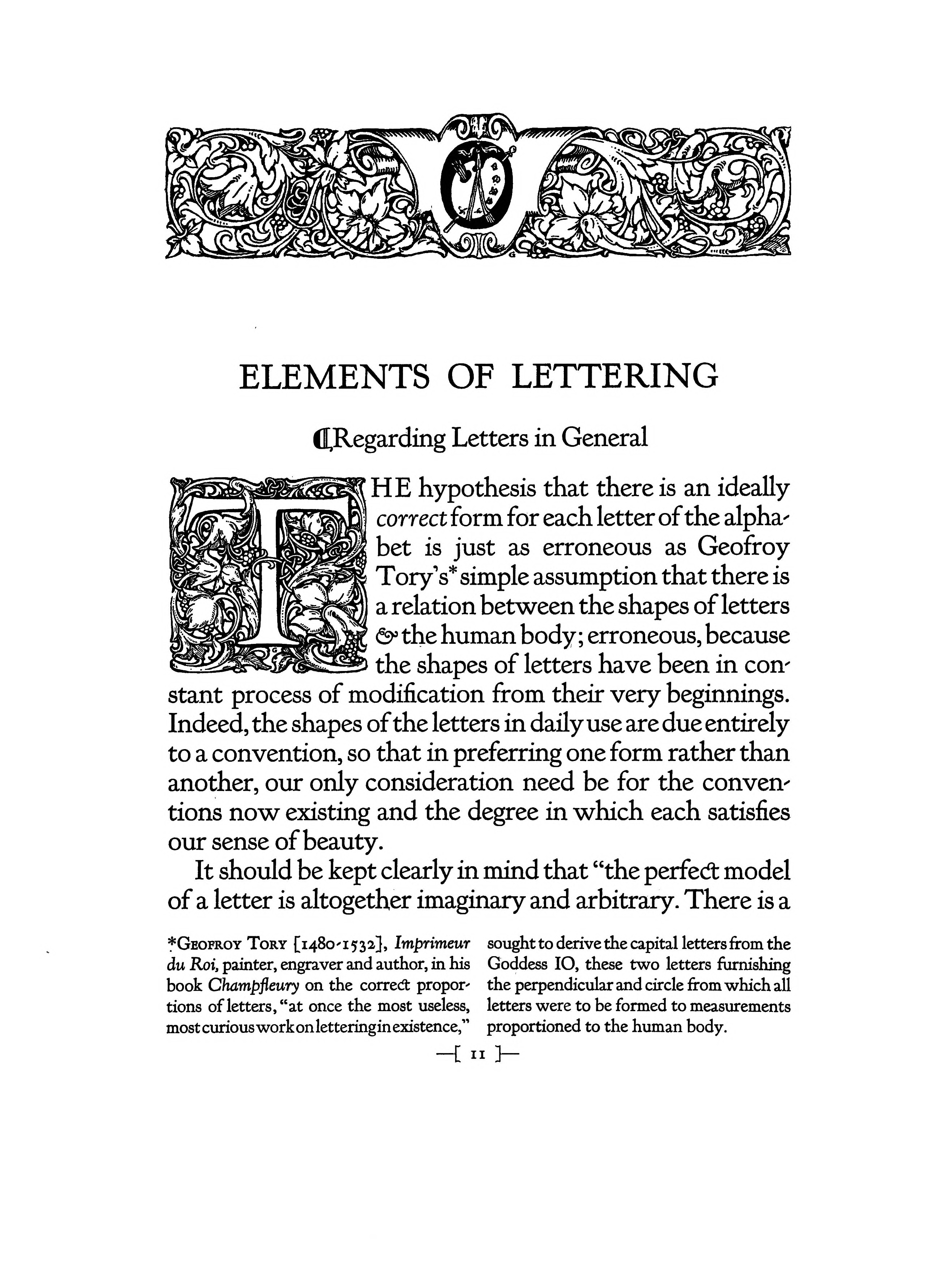
F. W. Goudy. Elements of Lettering (1922), typeset by Bertha Goudy

In 1903, the Goudys founded the Village Press with Will Ransom in Oak Park, Illinois. After the first year of operation, Ransom left the partnership. Bertha was the principal typesetter for the next 32 years. The Village Press's first production was "Printing," an essay by William Morris and Emery Walker, in keeping with the proprietors' dedication to Morris-style Arts and Crafts aesthetics and philosophy. They moved the press the following year to Hingham, Massachusetts, and in 1906 to New York City. Following a disastrous studio fire in 1908, Frederic Goudy increasingly specialized in type design, and Bertha Goudy took over the business of the press. He wrote and illustrated and she typeset two works now considered classics of lettering design: The Alphabet (Kennerley, 1918) and Elements of Lettering (Kennerley, 1922). The final move of the press was in 1924, to Marlborough-on-Hudson, New York, to a house with an adjacent mill, which the Goudys called Deepdene. Bertha Goudy was widely recognized during this period as the driving force behind the Village Press, and in 1933, Time magazine called her "the world's ablest woman printer." The American Institute of Graphic Arts recognized her achievements alongside those of her husband's in an exhibition honoring the thirtieth anniversary of the founding of the Village Press in 1933. One of her final and most demanding works was Mary Shelley's Frankenstein, for the Limited Editions Club, published in 1934.

== Death and tributes ==
Bertha Goudy suffered a stroke in December 1933, from which she only partially recovered. She died on October 21, 1935.

Following her death, a number of colleagues and friends memorialized Bertha Goudy's contributions to typography. Spearheaded by Edna Beilenson, co-proprietor of the Peter Pauper Press, a group of women active in fine press and book making collaborated to produce a feminist work entitled Bookmaking on the Distaff Side, published in 1937. Beilenson, Jane Grabhorn, Bruce Rogers, and others contributed, and convinced Frederic Goudy to include a memorial to his wife, which he later published separately as Bertha M. Goudy: Recollections by One Who Knew Her Best (Marlboro, NY: The Village Press, 1939), and set in Bertham type. He had named his hundredth typeface, Bertham, in honor of his wife ("Bertha M."). Female members of the same group of friends formed the Distaff Press, which later republished selections from Bookmaking on the Distaff Side, along with additional contributions, to produce Bertha S. Goudy: First Lady of Printing in 1958. This "remembrance of the distaff side of the Village Press" was issued as a fine press, limited edition publication, in the spirit of Bertha Goudy's own private press productions, hand-bound and hand-printed.

== Selected bibliography ==
- Morris, William, Emery Walker. Printing: An Essay. Park Ridge, Ill.: The Village Press, 1903.
- Goudy, Frederic W. Bertha M. Goudy: Recollections by One Who Knew Her Best. Marlboro, NY: The Village Press, 1939.
- Rogers, Bruce, Mabel H. Dwiggins, Alice G. Lochhead, Paul A. Bennett, George Macy, Frederic W. Goudy, Peter Beilenson, Mae B. Dunning, Jane B. Grabhorn, Joseph Blumenthal, Emily Connor, and John Anderson. Bertha S. Goudy: First Lady of Printing. Distaff Press, 1958.
- Rogers, Bruce, ed. Bookmaking on the Distaff Side. New York: Distaff Side, 1937.
