= Henry Lewis Bullen =

American printer and archivist

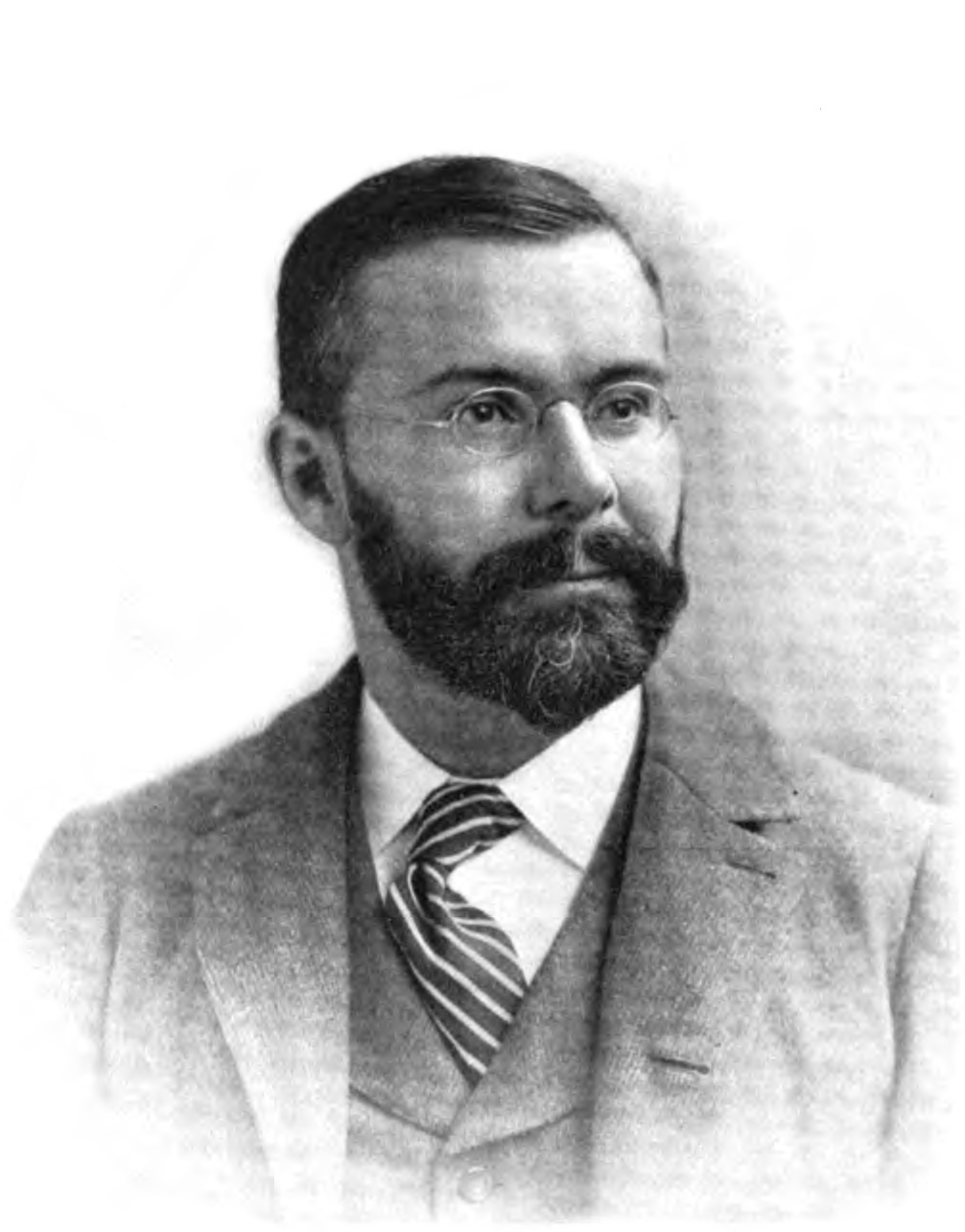
Henry Lewis Bullen

Henry Lewis Bullen (1857 – April 27, 1938) was an American printer and typographic archivist.

== Early life ==
Henry Lewis Bullen was born in 1857 in Ballarat, Australia to American-Scotch parentage. He left school at 14 to become a printers apprentice and began writing articles for trade publications. In 1875, he immigrated to the United States. He lived for ten years in Boston where he worked as a printer, later becoming the editor of Trade Review, a printers publication, and made frequent visits to New York City to study new printing technologies.

== Career ==
In 1891, Bullen moved to New York City to work as the advertising manager for Hamilton Manufacturing Company, a printers supplier, who later became part of The American Type Founders' Company (ATF).

Bullen experienced calamity in 1905, when he left to work at the United Printing Machinery Company. He rapidly fell out with his employer and was demoted, and then disappeared with $2750 of company money, being arrested by Pinkerton detectives with a ticket to Honolulu. He was sentenced to two years in prison (reduced from ten as a first offence). Bullen's friend Herbert Bingham suggested that he had experienced a breakdown due to overwork. Robert Nelson of ATF took pity on him and he returned to ATF in 1908.

Bullen became ATF's advertising manager and informal corporate historian, he was responsible for producing type specimen books, machinery and material catalogs and pamphlets. He also successfully marketed the concept of "type families," offering further weights than roman and italic and introduced classic revivals of Garamond, Caslon, Cloister, and Bodoni. He was also a contributor to The Inland Printer.

At ATF, Bullen began expanding his personal collection that would become the foundation for the ATF Library in 1908 in Jersey City. The ATF Library was "to serve as a model of art and craftsmanship to students of typography...to memorialize or honor predecessors in our profession or printers now living...[and to] enhance the appreciation by the general public of printing as an art and influence." The ATF Library merged the collections of Theodore Low De Vinne, Typothethae of the City of New York and the Franklin Typographic Society along with numerous smaller collections. Bullen served as librarian and was responsible for over 16,000 documents at its peak. In 1923, he advertised help at the library while compiling the 1923 type specimen book, hiring Beatrice Warde as assistant librarian. He later retired that year, and traveled to Europe to acquire rare books for the library. After ATF declared bankruptcy in 1933, Bullen began talks with Columbia University to acquire the library as he felt that the library housed at the university would provide the greatest research value to the public. The ATF Library was moved to Columbia University in 1936 and opened to the public in 1939. The university officially purchased the collection in 1941.

Bullen also lectured on graphic arts, wrote about typography, and curated exhibitions on typography. Contemporary amateur historian of printing David M. Macmillan however has expressed concern that his writing was often inaccurate: "I have come to the point where I find it impossible to rely upon anything that he said which does not have external corroboration." Beatrice Warde later in life said he had suppressed suspicions that the "Garamond" type his company was reviving was not really the work of sixteenth-century engraver Claude Garamond, noting that he had never been able to find a sixteenth-century book that contained it; Warde discovered a few years later that it had actually been cut by the little-known Jean Jannon in the following century. In 1911, he helped to found the Printers Apprentices of New York, which became a part of the New York School of Printing. He was awarded the AIGA Medal in 1934.

Bullen died on April 27, 1938, in Elmhurst, Queens.
