= Paul Bennett (typographer) =

American typographer and author

Paul Arthur Bennett (March 22, 1897 – December 18, 1966) was an American typographer and author.

== Biography ==
Paul Arthur Bennett was born in Brooklyn on March 22, 1897. He enlisted in the U.S. Army at 19, near the end of World War I. He served overseas from November 1918 to June 1919.

Bennett was an Advertising Manager of the Chandler Motor Co, in Cleveland, Ohio in the 1920s. More papers of Bennett appear in the early 1930s with the development of the Typophiles. Bennett joined the Mergenthaler Linotype Co. in 1928. The Mergenthaler Linotype helps clients on matter of design, production, advertising, and general correspondence.

Bennett took over the Typophiles in the early 1930s. The Typophiles is a group of men that were "interested in graphics and fine printing." Typophiles' membership, attendance, and orders written by Bennett are now housed in the New York Public Library Archives.

Bennett was director of typography for the Mergenthaler Linotype Company in the USA for 30 years before his retirement in 1962. Other clients included Fuller-Smith, Dunlop-Ward, the Chandler Motor Company. He wrote several papers, monographs, and keepsakes for The Typophiles, and also edited the book Books and Printing (1951). Bennett was a leading member of the Typophiles Society in New York City.

He died in his home in Jackson Heights, Queens.

== Notable awards ==
1961 AIGA Gold Medal
