= Beatrice Warde =

American art historian (1900–1969)

- Beatrice Warde in 1925
- Born: Beatrice Lamberton Becker; September 20, 1900; New York City, U.S.
- Died: September 16, 1969 (aged 68); Epsom, Surrey, England
- Other name: Paul Beaujon
- Education: Barnard College
- Occupations: Publicity manager, Editor
- Known for: Typographer, historian of printing
- Notable work: The Crystal Goblet (essay)

Beatrice Lamberton Warde (September 20, 1900 – September 16, 1969, née Beatrice Becker) was a twentieth-century writer and scholar of typography. As a marketing manager for the British Monotype Corporation, she was influential in the development of printing tastes in Britain and elsewhere in the mid-twentieth century and was recognized at the time as "[o]ne of the few women typographers in the world". Her writing advocated higher standards in printing, and championed intelligent use of historic typefaces from the past, which Monotype specialised in reviving, and the work of contemporary typeface designers.

== Early life and interests ==
Born in New York, Warde was the only daughter of May Lamberton Becker, a journalist on the staff of the New York Herald Tribune, and Gustave Becker, composer and teacher. Warde was educated at Barnard College at Columbia University. When she was 13 years old, her school introduced her to the art of calligraphy. This led to a general interest in typography and the history of letter forms during her college years. This interest did not translate into a print-related apprenticeship because she said that "the printing trade is barred to women, on the craftsman level", a fact that had "been true for many centuries". Despite the prejudice against women in the trade, she said that in contrast, "anyone who has a good sense of design can make the grade if they know their stuff – whether he or she is a man or a woman".

== Career ==
=== American Type Founders Company ===
She became acquainted with Bruce Rogers and, on his recommendation, was appointed after graduation to the post of assistant librarian to the American Type Founders Company. She worked in Jersey City under Henry Lewis Bullen, where she concentrated on self-education and research. While there she became acquainted with eminent typographers including Daniel Berkeley Updike and Stanley Morison, who later played a highly influential part in her professional life. She remained there from 1921 to 1925. While at ATF she was intrigued by Bullen's comment that he was sure the "Garamond" type his company was reviving, supposedly the work of sixteenth-century engraver Claude Garamond, was actually the work of someone else, noting that he had never seen it in a book of the period.

Recognising that the future of typographic and book design was in London with the new Monotype Composing Machine., Warde moved to Europe in 1925.

=== Historical research and The Fleuron ===
Beatrice Warde spent time investigating the origins of the Garamond design of type, and published the results in The Fleuron in 1926 under the pen-name "Paul Beaujon". (Note: Warde described that her choice for using a pen-name was driven by her perspective that women writers were often disrespected.) Her conclusion that many typefaces previously attributed to Claude Garamond were in fact made 90 years later by Jean Jannon was a lasting contribution to scholarship. (Note: Although not the whole truth: Warde's belief that the designs were obtained when Jannon was arrested has since been contradicted by a contract in the French archives reporting that they had been commissioned and paid for.) Warde later recalled she had amused herself imagining her "Paul Beaujon" persona to be "a man of long grey beard, four grandchildren, a great interest in antique furniture and a rather vague address in Montparnasse." She noted that the deception confused, but was not immediately suspected by other historians, who were surprised to read a work by a Frenchman in idiomatic English and mocking received wisdom by quoting from The Hunting of the Snark.

=== Publicity manager at Monotype ===
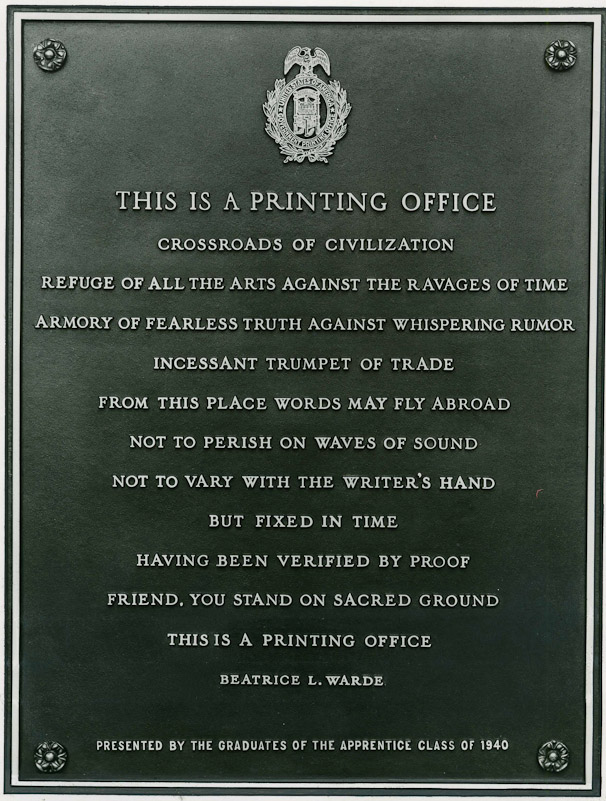
"This is a Printing Office" at the entrance to the United States Government Publishing Office

After publishing her discovery of Garamond's origin, "Paul Beaujon" was in 1927 offered the part-time post of editor of the Monotype Recorder, and Warde accepted—to the astonishment of Lanston Monotype Corporation executives in London, who were expecting a man. She was promoted to publicity manager in about 1929, a post she retained until her retirement in 1960 on her 60th birthday. She thought of herself as an outsider, working in a man's world, but she gained respect for her work and her personal qualities.

During her time there, she was responsible for planning the advertising and marketing activities for Monotype's new and widely acclaimed products. Working with Morison, Warde produced materials and lectures that connected British nationalist sentiment to the visual identity of corporations and functionalist views of efficiency. This kind of promotional activity aligned the political and public intentions of Jan Tschichold's New, or Modern typography, with the goals of business.

With the tenet of readability being a key benefit of good typography, Warde worked with Eric Gill to launch and promote Gill Sans. Warde penned her famous broadside "This is a Printing Office", to show the Perpetua typeface off. It has since been found on the walls of numerous printing offices and has been cast in bronze and is mounted at the entrance to the United States Government Publishing Office in Washington, D.C.; it has been translated into numerous languages and has been parodied.

Warde's approach of connecting the craft of typography with the concerns of business were not always welcome, even within Monotype. She exchanged many heated letters with Eric Gill about the nature of this relationship, with Gill denigrating the use of promotional materials to sell his designs. (Note: Part of the relationship between Gill and Warde has been explained to be informed by their affair with one another, but also with the fact that Warde was asserting her intellectual perspective in a male-dominated profession.) Warde defended her position by arguing, as one historian notes, "that mass culture would be elevated and the public good achieved when artists came to accept their social responsibility, and to regard the forces of advertising as a means to achieve their ends, not the defeat of everything".

=== Design communicator ===
While aesthetically associated with "the new traditionalist" typographic movement, Warde made herself part of a larger campaign to raise the standards of commercial publishing by advocating "for the role of design in good management". She often visited printing schools, universities, and factories both in England and abroad to bring this message. During an invitation to speak in Australia, she spoke for cultivating "a print-conscious public" as a necessity for the printing industry to do its best. For Warde, this meant teaching good handwriting and designing attractive schoolbooks for children. All of this was to promote "a general, high, critical standard in the public at large".

As Allen Hutt wrote in 1969:

She was an original typographical scholar of the first rank (the 'Paul Beaujon' Garamond and other studies in The Fleuron and The Monotype Recorder); she was a practicing typographer of sure taste and a calligrapher of elegance; for over 30 years she was a brilliant editor of the Recorder and the Monotype Newsletter, as part of her devoted service to The Monotype Corporation as its publicity manager; she was Stanley Morison's inseparable and incomparable lieutenant in the great work of Britain's typographical renaissance; she was beyond peer as a public expositor, and propagandist for, good typography.

== Works ==
=== The Crystal Goblet ===
"The Crystal Goblet" is an essay on typography by Beatrice Warde. The essay was first delivered as a speech, called "Printing Should Be Invisible", given to the British Typographers' Guild at the St Bride Institute in London, on October 7, 1930. Like many of Warde's other writings, the essay was written with the intent to be spoken before printed, as she carefully considered the invocations of voice, presence, and personal connection while reading aloud.

The essay is notable historically as a call for increased clarity in printing and typography. It is now significant as a common reading in the study of typography and graphic design. (Note: For example, Heller, Steven (2001). "On the choice of typeface". Texts on type : critical writings on typography. New York: Allworth Press. pp. 193–197. ISBN 978-1581150827.) The essay has been reprinted many times and is a touchstone for the concept of "clear" typography and the straightforward presentation of content.

Days after her 1930 address, the lecture appeared in a newsletter called the British & Colonial Printer & Stationer. It was printed again as a pamphlet in 1932 and 1937. Thenceforward, it appeared as either "The Crystal Goblet" or "The Crystal Goblet, or Printing Should Be Invisible". In 1955 it was published again and reached its widest audience yet in a book called The Crystal Goblet: Sixteen Essays on Typography.

Typically, design historians associate Stanley Morison as the source of "new traditionalist" ideas and "credit Beatrice Warde with spreading his influence. "The Crystal Goblet" is rich with metaphors. The title itself is a reference to a clear vessel holding wine, where the vessel, the printed word, gives no obstruction to the presentation of its content, the text. Warde poses a choice between two wine glasses: one of "solid gold, wrought in the most exquisite patterns" and one of "crystal-clear glass".

Now the man who first chose glass instead of clay or metal to hold his wine was a "modernist" in the sense in which I am going to use that term. That is, the first he asked of this particular object was not "How should it look?" but "What must it do?" and to that extent all good typography is modernist.

Throughout the essay, Warde argues for the discipline and humility required to create quietly set, "transparent" book pages.

=== Other works ===
- Beaujon, Paul (1926). "The Garamond Type, Sixteenth and Seventeenth Century Sources Considered". The Fleuron (5).
- Warde, Beatrice (September 1, 1935). "Type faces, old and new". The Library. s4-XVI (2): 121–143. doi:10.1093/library/s4-xvi.2.121. ISSN 0024-2160.
- An American in England (Pen name of Warde), Enjoying England: A book about an enchanted Island, published by the LNER, 1931
- Ibbett, William J. (1931). "Preface". One Hundred Facets of Winter and Spring. Paul Beaujon. Shaftesbury at the High House Press.
- Beaujon, Paul (1935). Unjustified Lines: A Volume of Rhymes About Printers and Their Ancestors. Chiswick Polytechnic School of Art.
- Beaujon, Paul (1938). Peace under the Earth: dialogues from the year 1946 recorded by Paul Beaujon. London: Megaw.
- During World War 2 she also contributed to American Outpost Newsletter, and her mother featured her letters about London in the New York Herald Tribune
- Compiler of Token of Freedom, c. 1940 (An anthology given to every child who was evacuated to North America during World War II)
- Warde, Beatrice (October 1943). "Books as Ammunition". Wilson Library Bulletin.
- Warde, Beatrice (Summer 1945). "Whither British Typography?". Printing Review.
- Warde, Beatrice (1970). The Monotype Recorder: 'I Am a Communicator', a Selection of Writings and Talks by Beatrice Warde. Monotype Corporation.
- H., Steinberg, S. (2017). "Foreword". Five Hundred Years of Printing. Warde, Beatrice. Mineola: Dover Publications. pp. 7–10. ISBN 9780486814452. OCLC 987642726.

== Legacy ==
Warde's success as a design communicator has placed much of her work, like The Crystal Goblet, within the canon of graphic design and typography history. She had, as one historian has noted, "the popular touch" which connected printing education with the printing trade. Her work has been continually referred to within discussions on graphic design and typography, for example during the 1990s "legibility wars" or debates concerning electronic interface design.

In 2010, an archive relating to her life and work was established at the Cadbury Research Library, University of Birmingham.

=== TDC Beatrice Warde Scholarship ===
The Type Directors Club and Monotype offer a scholarship under her name for young women who demonstrate exceptional talent, sophistication, and skill in the use of typography. The Beatrice Warde scholarship emphasizes the merging of technology and typography, as she used to encourage the best use of technology in design.

== Personal life ==
In 1922, Beatrice married Frederic Warde, printer to Princeton University and a typographic designer. After moving to Europe in 1925, their marriage ended in separation in November 1926, followed by divorce in 1938. Although it is known that the glamorous Warde posed for Eric Gill, it was Stanley Morison with whom she had a long intimate relationship. Morison divorced his wife for her, and Beatrice left her husband for him. Although, Morison, being a Catholic, decided he could not actually marry Warde, she was with him when he died in 1967.
