= Baseline (magazine) =

- Cover of issue 63
- Editor: Hans Dieter Reichert
- Founded: 1979
- First issue: 1979
- Company: Bradbourne Publishing
- Country: United Kingdom
- Language: English
- Website: www.baselinemagazine.com
- ISSN: 0954-9226
- OCLC: 29834120

Baseline magazine (ISSN 0954-9226) is a magazine devoted to typography, book arts and graphic design (distinct from the information technology magazine of the same name published by QuinStreet).

== History ==
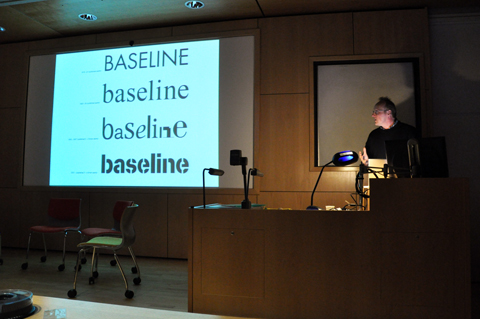
Editor and Art Director of Baseline, Hans Dieter Reichert gives a talk in 2009 about the magazine's history

Since Baseline 19, which appeared in 1995, Baseline has been published by Bradbourne Publishing, co-edited by Mike Daines and Hans Dieter Reichert and art-directed by HDR Visual Communication. It is characterized by its large format, sumptuous art and double cover. It has won several major international design awards in the USA, Europe and Japan. The magazine is featured in several academic publications (i.e. Philip Megg's History of Graphic design and Idea magazine).

Before issue 19, publishers, editors, magazine dimensions and quality varied as the magazine evolved from a small format booklet that first appeared in 1979. Early editors included Mike Daines (Baselines 1–3), Tony Bisley (Baseline 4), Geoffrey Lawrence (Baseline 5) and Erik Spiekermann (Baselines 6, 7). The first full-color Baseline appeared as issue 8. Baseline 10 expanded the dimensions of the magazine from 8¼ x 11¾ to 10½ x 14¼. Baseline assumed its current size of 9¾ x 13¾ with Baseline 14.

The first four issues of Baseline were published by TSI (Typographic Systems International Ltd.). Following TSI, issues 5–18 had been published by Letraset, a graphics product company, but as the magazine flourished Letraset faced difficult times. Mike Daines, Jenny Daines and Hans Dieter Reichert, Veronika Reichert formed Bradbourne Publishing Ltd. and bought the magazine from Letraset in 1994.

== See also ==
- Communication Arts
- Graphis Inc.
- Print (magazine)
- Visible Language
