= Marlborough, New York =

- Town
- Location in Ulster County and the state of New York.
- Coordinates: 41°37′55″N 73°59′3″W
- Country: United States
- State: New York
- County: Ulster

Area
  - Total: 26.50 sq mi (68.63 km^{2})
  - Land: 24.47 sq mi (63.38 km^{2})
  - Water: 2.03 sq mi (5.26 km^{2})
- Elevation: 515 ft (157 m)

Population (2020)
  - Total: 8,712
  - Density: 356.0/sq mi (137.5/km^{2})
- Time zone: UTC-5 (Eastern (EST))
  - Summer (DST): UTC-4 (EDT)
- ZIP code: 12542
- Area code: 845
- FIPS code: 36-45722
- GNIS feature ID: 0979200
- Website: https://www.townofmarlboroughny.gov/

Marlborough is a town in Ulster County, New York, United States, in the southeastern corner of the county. The population was 8,712 at the 2020 census. U.S. Route 9W passes through the eastern part of the town. US Route 44 and NY 55 cross the northwestern corner of the town. The town was named after the Duke of Marlborough.

== History ==
A land grant (patent) of the territory was made to Captain John Evans of the Royal Navy in 1694. One of his first settlers arrived in 1697.

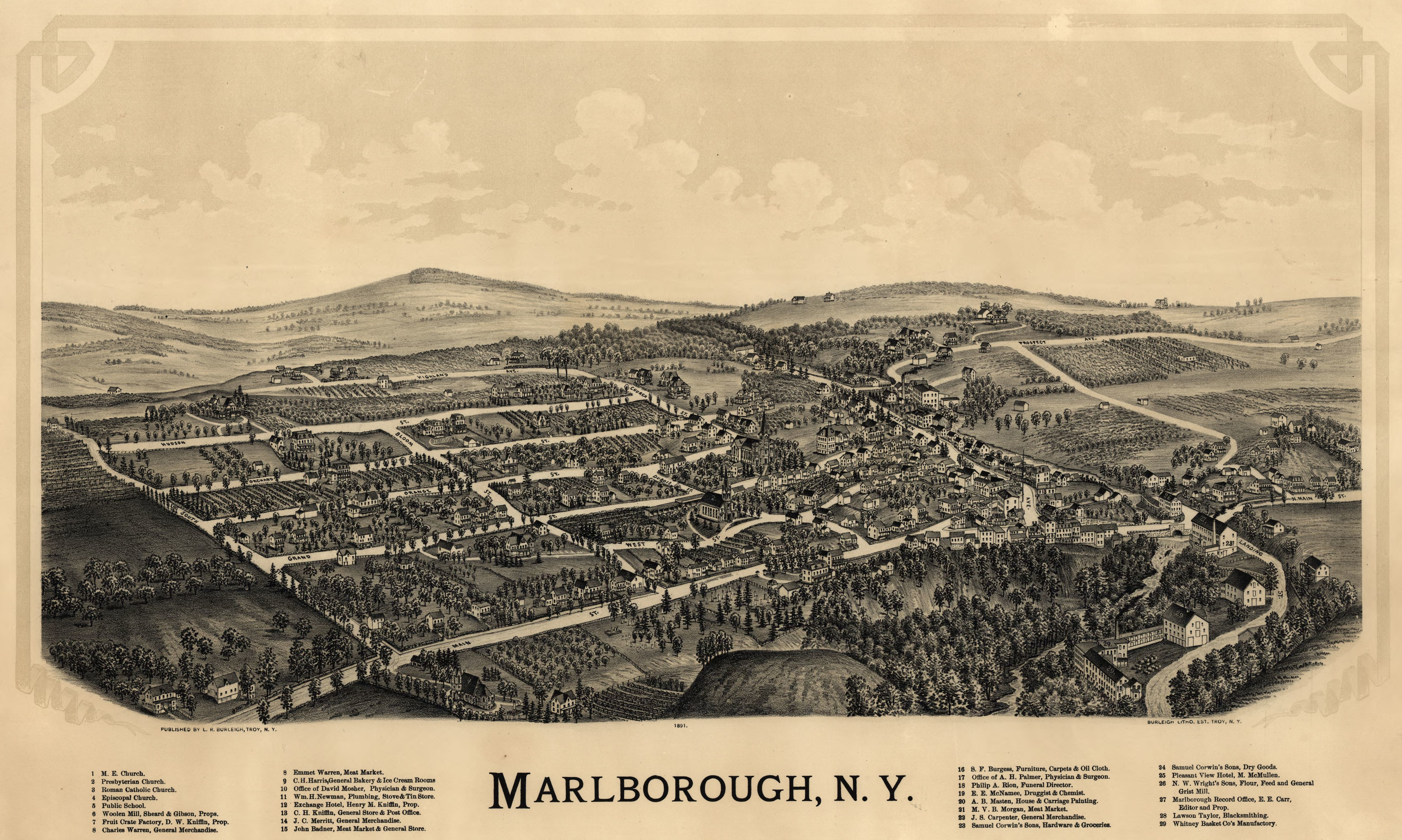
Perspective map of Marlborough from 1891 with list of landmarks published by L.R. Burleigh

The region was part of the Newburgh Precinct and was set apart in 1772. The Town of Marlborough was formed in 1788 during a period of town formation in the county. Part of the town was used to create the town of Plattekill in 1800.

== Geography ==
According to the United States Census Bureau, the town has a total area of 26.5 square miles (69 km^{2}), of which 24.8 square miles (64 km^{2}) is land and 1.7 square miles (4.4 km^{2}) (6.3%) is water.

The eastern town line, marked by the Hudson River is the border of Dutchess County, and the southern town line is the border of Orange County. The western border of the town closely parallels the Marlboro Mountain ridge, dividing Marlborough from the town of Plattekill.

The lowest point in the town is the shore of the Hudson River, which is at sea level. The highest point is the summit of Marlboro Mountain, at 1,127 feet (344 m).

== Demographics ==
Historical population
Census	Pop.	Note	%±
1790	2,241		—
1820	2,248		—
1830	2,272		1.1%
1840	2,523		11.0%
1850	2,406		−4.6%
1860	2,776		15.4%
1870	2,975		7.2%
1880	3,472		16.7%
1890	3,598		3.6%
1900	3,978		10.6%
1910	3,841		−3.4%
1920	3,274		−14.8%
1930	3,627		10.8%
1940	3,794		4.6%
1950	4,003		5.5%
1960	4,863		21.5%
1970	5,657		16.3%
1980	7,055		24.7%
1990	7,430		5.3%
2000	8,263		11.2%
2010	8,808		6.6%
2020	8,712		−1.1%
U.S. Decennial Census 2020

As of the census of 2000, there were 8,263 people, 3,020 households, and 2,144 families residing in the town. The population density was 332.8 inhabitants per square mile (128.5/km^{2}). There were 3,176 housing units at an average density of 127.9 per square mile (49.4/km^{2}). The racial makeup of the town was 94.48% white, 2.82% African American, .19% Native American, .33% Asian, .01% Pacific Islander, .84% from other races, and 1.33% from two or more races. Hispanic or Latino of any race were 3.98% of the population.

There were 3,020 households, out of which 36.0% had children under the age of 18 living with them, 57.1% were married couples living together, 9.5% had a female householder with no husband present, and 29% were non-families. 22.6% of all households were made up of individuals, and 9.1% had someone living alone who was 65 years of age or older. The average household size was 2.73 and the average family size was 3.25.

In the town, the population was spread out, with 26.5% under the age of 18, 7.4% from 18 to 24, 30.8% from 25 to 44, 23.5% from 45 to 64, and 11.7% who were 65 years of age or older. The median age was 37 years. For every 100 females, there were 96.8 males. For every 100 females age 18 and over, there were 94.8 males.

The median income for a household in the town was $49,788, and the median income for a family was $56,933. Males had a median income of $38,074 versus $29,608 for females. The per capita income for the town was $21,079. About 5.8% of families and 8.2% of the population were below the poverty line, including 8.9% of those under age 18 and 9.5% of those age 65 or over.

== Communities and locations in Marlborough ==
- Baileys Gap – a hamlet at the northern town line on Route 44.
- Central – a location west of Milton.
- Marlboro – this hamlet is in the southeastern part of the town on Route 9W.
- Milton – this hamlet is in the northeastern part of the town on Route 9W, adjacent to the Hudson River.
- Lattintown – a hamlet in the western part of the town on Route 11. The Lattingtown Baptist Church was listed on the National Register of Historic Places in 2010.
