= Script typeface =

Class of typefaces inspired by handwriting

Cursive is an example of a casual script.

Caflisch Script is an example of a casual script.

Script typefaces are based on the varied and often fluid strokes created by handwriting. They are generally used for display or trade printing, rather than for extended body text in the Latin alphabet. Some Greek alphabet typefaces, especially historically, have been a closer simulation of handwriting.

== Styles ==
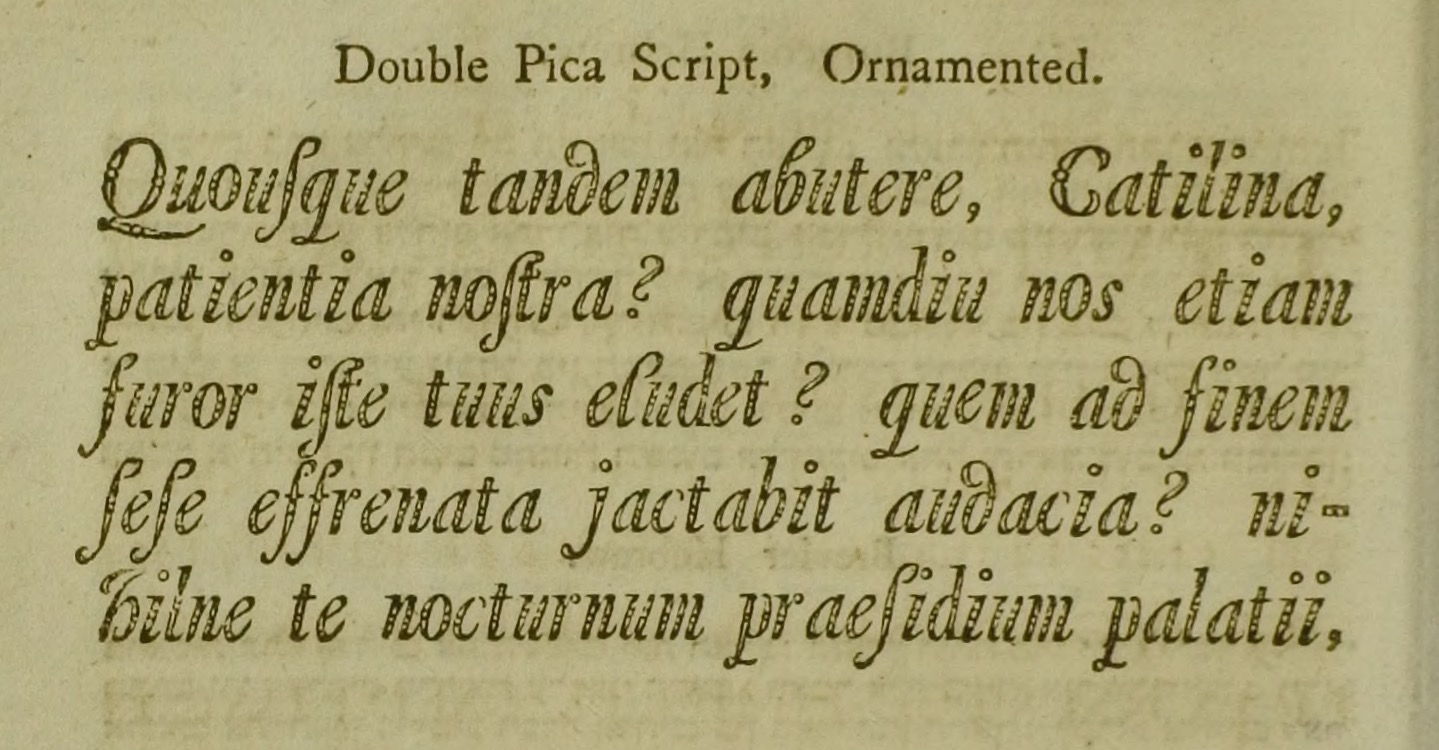
Union Pearl, an early script typeface

Script typefaces are organized into highly regular formal types similar to cursive writing and looser, more casual scripts.

=== Formal scripts ===
A majority of formal scripts are based upon the letterforms of seventeenth and eighteenth century writing-masters like George Bickham, George Shelley and Charles Snell. The letters in their original form are generated by a quill or metal nib of a pen. Both are able to create fine and thick strokes. Typefaces based upon their style of writing appear late in the eighteenth century and early nineteenth century. Contemporary revivals of formal script faces can be seen in Kuenstler Script and Matthew Carter's typeface Snell Roundhand. These typefaces are frequently used for invitations and diplomas to effect an elevated and elegant feeling. They may use typographic ligatures to have letters connect.

=== Casual scripts ===
Casual scripts show a less formal, more active hand. The strokes may vary in width but often appear to have been created by wet brush rather than a pen nib. They appeared in the early twentieth century, and with the advent of photocomposition in the early 1950s, their number rapidly increased. They were popularly used in advertising in Europe and North America into the 1970s. Examples of casual script types include Brush Script, Kaufmann and Mistral. Some may be non-connecting like Freestyle Script.

== Technology ==
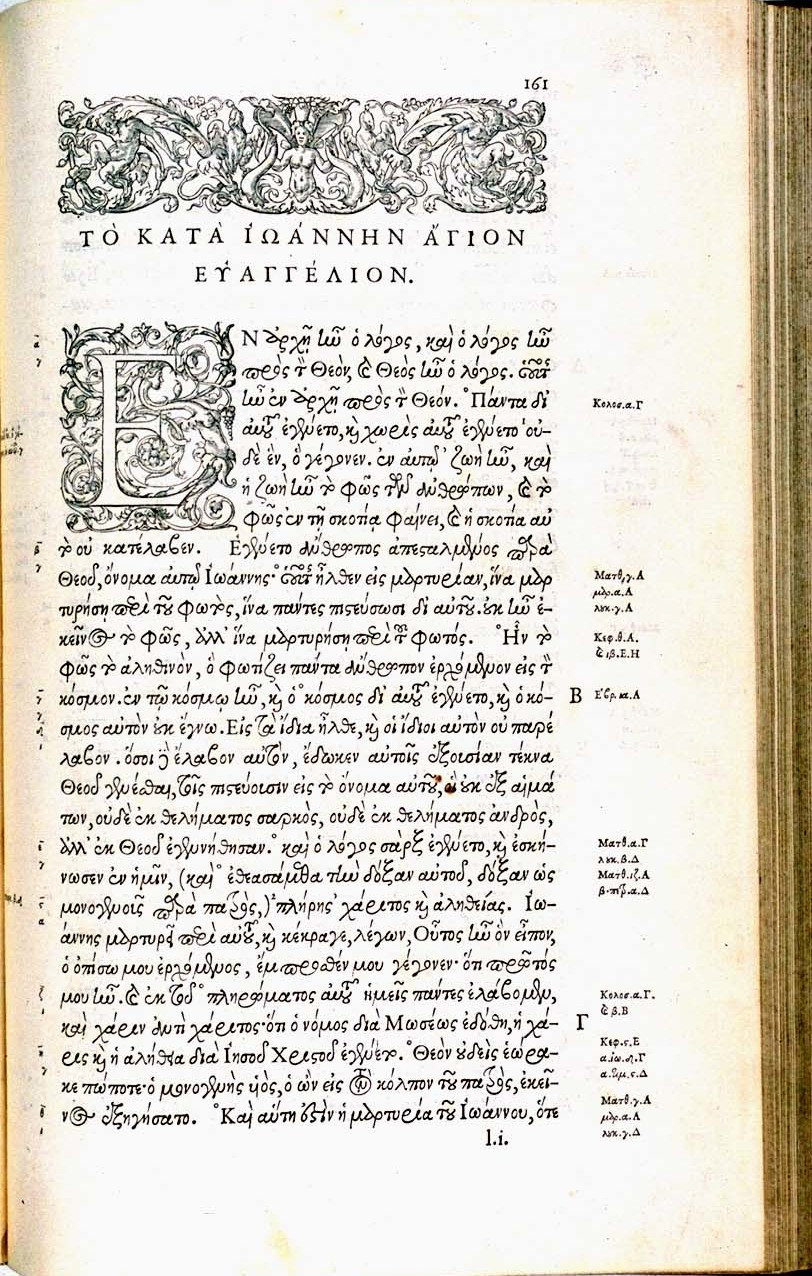
Claude Garamond's famous grecs du roi typeface, intended to mimic the handwriting of Cretan scribe Angelo Vergecio. To mimic his writing, many alternate characters are needed. While this style was once very popular in printing the Greek alphabet, it is no longer used due to its complexity.

Script typefaces place particular demands on printing technology if the letters are intended to join up and vary like handwriting. A typeface intended to mimic handwriting, such as Claude Garamond's grecs du roi typeface, will require many alternate characters. In digital type these (once drawn) can be substituted seamlessly through contextual ligature insertion in applications like InDesign, but this was complicated in metal. Another complexity in metal type was that sorts had to have delicate overhanging parts to interlock. This required careful design and casting for the sorts to fit together without gaps or the sorts breaking, or leaving gaps to be filled in by the natural spread of ink on paper.

Script typefaces have evolved rapidly in the second half of the 20th century due to developments in technology and the end of widespread use of metal type. Historically, most signwriting on logos, displays and shop frontages did not use fonts but was rather custom-designed lettering created by signpainters and engravers. As phototypesetting and then computers have made printing text at a range of sizes far easier than in the metal type period, it has become increasingly common for businesses to use type for logos and signs rather than hand-drawn lettering. In addition, phototypesetting made overlap of characters relatively simple, something very complicated to achieve in metal type. Matthew Carter has cited his 1966 Snell Roundhand typeface as deliberately designed to replicate a style of calligraphy hard to simulate in metal. An additional development enabling more sophisticated script fonts has been the release of the OpenType format, which most fonts are now released in. This allows fonts to have a large character set, increasing the sophistication of design possible, and contextual insertion, in which characters that match one another are inserted into a document automatically, so fonts can convincingly mimic handwriting without the user having to choose the correct substitute characters manually. Many modern script typefaces emulate the styles of hand-drawn lettering from different historical periods.

== Unicode ==
For most conventional usages, the regular alpha-numeric codepoints for ordinary text should be used, irrespective if their presentation. Script presentation is specified using (for example) the HTML span style="font-family= command.

For mathematical use, there are sets of dedicated codepoints with both capital and small letters. Few fonts provide support for all 52 characters, and their presentations vary in style from roundhand to chancery hand and others.

Unicode 14.0 defines the mapping of variant selectors for two uppercase letters as follows: U+FE00 corresponds to chancery style for \mathcal, and U+FE01 corresponds to roundhand style for \mathscr.

General scripts
Codepoints	Unicode	Image
U+1D49C	𝒜	$\mathcal A$
U+212C	ℬ	$\mathcal B$
U+1D49E	𝒞	$\mathcal C$
U+1D49F	𝒟	$\mathcal D$
U+2130	ℰ	$\mathcal E$
U+2131	ℱ	$\mathcal F$
U+1D4A2	𝒢	$\mathcal G$
U+210B	ℋ	$\mathcal H$
U+2110	ℐ	$\mathcal I$
U+1D4A5	𝒥	$\mathcal J$
U+1D4A6	𝒦	$\mathcal K$
U+2112	ℒ	$\mathcal L$
U+2133	ℳ	$\mathcal M$
U+1D4A9	𝒩	$\mathcal N$
U+1D4AA	𝒪	$\mathcal O$
U+1D4AB	𝒫	$\mathcal P$
U+1D4AC	𝒬	$\mathcal Q$
U+211B	ℛ	$\mathcal R$
U+1D4AE	𝒮	$\mathcal S$
U+1D4AF	𝒯	$\mathcal T$
U+1D4B0	𝒰	$\mathcal U$
U+1D4B1	𝒱	$\mathcal V$
U+1D4B2	𝒲	$\mathcal W$
U+1D4B3	𝒳	$\mathcal X$
U+1D4B4	𝒴	$\mathcal Y$
U+1D4B5	𝒵	$\mathcal Z$
U+1D4B6	𝒶	$\mathcal a$
U+1D4B7	𝒷	$\mathcal b$
U+1D4B8	𝒸	$\mathcal c$
U+1D4B9	𝒹	$\mathcal d$
U+212F	ℯ	$\mathcal e$
U+1D4BB	𝒻	$\mathcal f$
U+210A	ℊ	$\mathcal g$
U+1D4BD	𝒽	$\mathcal h$
U+1D4BE	𝒾	$\mathcal i$
U+1D4BF	𝒿	$\mathcal j$
U+1D4C0	𝓀	$\mathcal k$
U+1D4C1	𝓁	$\ell$
U+1D4C2	𝓂	$\mathcal m$
U+1D4C3	𝓃	$\mathcal n$
U+2134	ℴ	$\mathcal o$
U+1D4C5	𝓅	$\mathcal p$
U+1D4C6	𝓆	$\mathcal q$
U+1D4C7	𝓇	$\mathcal r$
U+1D4C8	𝓈	$\mathcal s$
U+1D4C9	𝓉	$\mathcal t$
U+1D4CA	𝓊	$\mathcal u$
U+1D4CB	𝓋	$\mathcal v$
U+1D4CC	𝓌	$\mathcal w$
U+1D4CD	𝓍	$\mathcal x$
U+1D4CE	𝓎	$\mathcal y$
U+1D4CF	𝓏	$\mathcal z$

Bold scripts
Codepoints	Unicode	Image
U+1D4D0	𝓐	$\boldsymbol{\mathcal A}$
U+1D4D1	𝓑	$\boldsymbol{\mathcal B}$
U+1D4D2	𝓒	$\boldsymbol{\mathcal C}$
U+1D4D3	𝓓	$\boldsymbol{\mathcal D}$
U+1D4D4	𝓔	$\boldsymbol{\mathcal E}$
U+1D4D5	𝓕	$\boldsymbol{\mathcal F}$
U+1D4D6	𝓖	$\boldsymbol{\mathcal G}$
U+1D4D7	𝓗	$\boldsymbol{\mathcal H}$
U+1D4D8	𝓘	$\boldsymbol{\mathcal I}$
U+1D4D9	𝓙	$\boldsymbol{\mathcal J}$
U+1D4DA	𝓚	$\boldsymbol{\mathcal K}$
U+1D4DB	𝓛	$\boldsymbol{\mathcal L}$
U+1D4DC	𝓜	$\boldsymbol{\mathcal M}$
U+1D4DD	𝓝	$\boldsymbol{\mathcal N}$
U+1D4DE	𝓞	$\boldsymbol{\mathcal O}$
U+1D4DF	𝓟	$\boldsymbol{\mathcal P}$
U+1D4E0	𝓠	$\boldsymbol{\mathcal Q}$
U+1D4E1	𝓡	$\boldsymbol{\mathcal R}$
U+1D4E2	𝓢	$\boldsymbol{\mathcal S}$
U+1D4E3	𝓣	$\boldsymbol{\mathcal T}$
U+1D4E4	𝓤	$\boldsymbol{\mathcal U}$
U+1D4E5	𝓥	$\boldsymbol{\mathcal V}$
U+1D4E6	𝓦	$\boldsymbol{\mathcal W}$
U+1D4E7	𝓧	$\boldsymbol{\mathcal X}$
U+1D4E8	𝓨	$\boldsymbol{\mathcal Y}$
U+1D4E9	𝓩	$\boldsymbol{\mathcal Z}$
U+1D4EA	𝓪	$\boldsymbol{\mathcal a}$
U+1D4EB	𝓫	$\boldsymbol{\mathcal b}$
U+1D4EC	𝓬	$\boldsymbol{\mathcal c}$
U+1D4ED	𝓭	$\boldsymbol{\mathcal d}$
U+1D4EE	𝓮	$\boldsymbol{\mathcal e}$
U+1D4EF	𝓯	$\boldsymbol{\mathcal f}$
U+1D4F0	𝓰	$\boldsymbol{\mathcal g}$
U+1D4F1	𝓱	$\boldsymbol{\mathcal h}$
U+1D4F2	𝓲	$\boldsymbol{\mathcal i}$
U+1D4F3	𝓳	$\boldsymbol{\mathcal j}$
U+1D4F4	𝓴	$\boldsymbol{\mathcal k}$
U+1D4F5	𝓵	$\boldsymbol{\ell}$
U+1D4F6	𝓶	$\boldsymbol{\mathcal m}$
U+1D4F7	𝓷	$\boldsymbol{\mathcal n}$
U+1D4F8	𝓸	$\boldsymbol{\mathcal o}$
U+1D4F9	𝓹	$\boldsymbol{\mathcal p}$
U+1D4FA	𝓺	$\boldsymbol{\mathcal q}$
U+1D4FB	𝓻	$\boldsymbol{\mathcal r}$
U+1D4FC	𝓼	$\boldsymbol{\mathcal s}$
U+1D4FD	𝓽	$\boldsymbol{\mathcal t}$
U+1D4FE	𝓾	$\boldsymbol{\mathcal u}$
U+1D4FF	𝓿	$\boldsymbol{\mathcal v}$
U+1D500	𝔀	$\boldsymbol{\mathcal w}$
U+1D501	𝔁	$\boldsymbol{\mathcal x}$
U+1D502	𝔂	$\boldsymbol{\mathcal y}$
U+1D503	𝔃	$\boldsymbol{\mathcal z}$

These characters are: 𝒜ℬ𝒞𝒟ℰℱ𝒢ℋℐ𝒥𝒦ℒℳ𝒩𝒪𝒫𝒬ℛ𝒮𝒯𝒰𝒱𝒲𝒳𝒴𝒵 𝒶𝒷𝒸𝒹ℯ𝒻ℊ𝒽𝒾𝒿𝓀𝓁𝓂𝓃ℴ𝓅𝓆𝓇𝓈𝓉𝓊𝓋𝓌𝓍𝓎𝓏

- Some characters are named "SCRIPT ..." in Unicode:

U+2113 ℓ SCRIPT SMALL L (&ell;)
U+2118 ℘ SCRIPT CAPITAL P (&weierp;, &wp;) (actually a misnomer, name is corrected into WEIERSTRASS ELLIPTIC FUNCTION)

== See also ==
- Antiqua (typeface class)
- Blackletter
- Chancery hand
- Record type
