= Antoine Augereau =

French printer, bookseller and punchcutter (1485–1534)

Antoine Augereau (1485–1534) was a Renaissance printer, bookseller and punchcutter in Paris. He was one of the first French punchcutters to produce Roman type, at a time where other French printers were mostly using blackletter. He worked for Robert Estienne, who was one of the earliest Parisian printers to print Roman type in the style of Aldus Manutius.

He was a contemporary of other eminent French printers, such as Simon de Colines and Geoffroy Tory, while Claude Garamond, whose roman type became the most influential in Europe, apprenticed with him around the year 1510.

== Biography ==
His print-shop, located on Rue Saint-Jacques, was only in business for less than three years, between 1532 and 1534.

In 1533 he anonymously published Queen Marguerite de Navarre's Miroir de l'âme pécheresse ("The Mirror of the Sinful Soul"), a work of mystical Christian poetry that was immediately condemned by the Sorbonne's Faculty of Theology and forwarded to the Parliament for censorship. Under orders from King Francis I, Marguerite's brother, the Sorbonne retracted their condemnation of Miroir, alleging that their scrutiny was only due to the anonymous nature of its publication. This emboldened Augereau, who published two more editions of the poem that same year and with the identity of the author clearly stated. Each successive edition contained more and more Calvinist content, with the third edition also containing a verse translation of Psalm 6 by royal poet Clément Marot, at a time when the Hierarchy of the Catholic Church in France opposed the translation of the Bible into Middle French.

Already arrested and released in 1533 on suspicion of heresy because of his pro-evangelical publications, Augereau was among the first to be arrested in December 1534 as part of the anti-Huguenot backlash that followed the public humiliation of the King in the Affair of the Placards. On 24 December 1534, Augereau was executed for heresy and publishing anti-Catholic books.
