= Greek ligatures =

Ligatures used in Greek writing

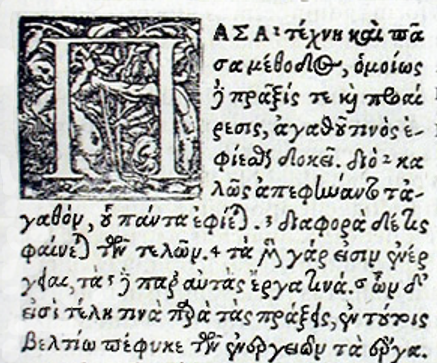
Early Greek print, from a 1566 edition of Aristotle. The sample shows the -os ligature in the middle of the second line (in the word μέθοδος), the kai ligature below it in the third line, and the -ou- ligature right below that in the fourth line, alongside many others.

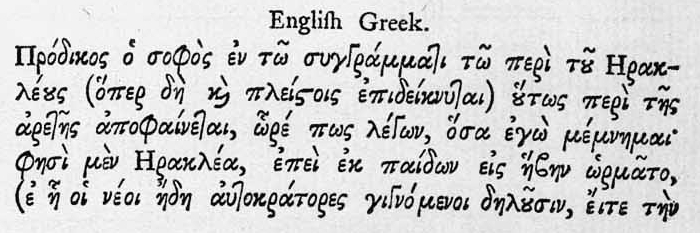
18th-century typeface sample by William Caslon, showing a greatly reduced set of ligatures (-ου- in "τοῦ", end of first line; -στ- in πλείστοις, middle of second line; and the καὶ abbreviation).

Greek ligatures are graphic combinations of the letters of the Greek alphabet that were used in medieval handwritten Greek and in early printing. Ligatures were used in the cursive writing style and very extensively in later minuscule writing. There were dozens of conventional ligatures. Some of them stood for frequent letter combinations, some for inflectional endings of words, and some were abbreviations of entire words.

== History ==
In early printed Greek from around 1500, many ligatures fashioned after contemporary manuscript hands continued to be used. Important models for this early typesetting practice were the designs of Aldus Manutius in Venice, and those of Claude Garamond in Paris, who created the influential Grecs du roi typeface in 1541. However, the use of ligatures gradually declined during the 17th and 18th centuries and became mostly obsolete in modern typesetting. Among the ligatures that remained in use the longest are the Omicron-Upsilon ligature Ȣ for ου, which resembles an o with an u on top, and the abbreviation ϗ for καὶ ('and'), which resembles a κ with a downward stroke on the right. The ου ligature is still occasionally used in decorative writing, while the καὶ abbreviation has some limited usage in functions similar to the Latin ampersand (&). Another ligature that was relatively frequent in early modern printing is a ligature of Ο with ς (a small sigma inside an omicron) for a terminal ος.

The ligature ϛ for στ, now called stigma, survived in a special role besides its use as a ligature proper. It took on the function of a number sign for "6", having been visually conflated with the cursive form of the ancient letter digamma, which had this numeral function.

== Unicode ==
The abbreviation ϗ has been encoded since Unicode version 3.0 (1999). An uppercase version Ϗ was added in version 5.1 (2008). A lower and upper case "stigma", designed for its numeric use, is also encoded in Unicode. Letters derived from the ου ligature exist for use in Latin, and for Cyrillic, though not for Greek itself. Some attempts have been made at recreating typesetting with ligatures in modern computer fonts, either through Unicode-compliant OpenType glyph replacement, or with simpler but non-standardized methods of glyph-by-glyph encoding.

- U+0222 Ȣ LATIN CAPITAL LETTER OU
- U+0223 ȣ LATIN SMALL LETTER OU
- U+03CF Ϗ GREEK CAPITAL KAI SYMBOL
- U+03D7 ϗ GREEK KAI SYMBOL
- U+03DA Ϛ GREEK LETTER STIGMA
- U+03DB ϛ GREEK SMALL LETTER STIGMA
- U+A64A Ꙋ CYRILLIC CAPITAL LETTER MONOGRAPH UK
- U+A64B ꙋ CYRILLIC SMALL LETTER MONOGRAPH UK

== Example images ==
-εῖ-
(-ei-)

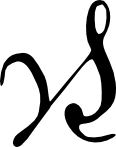
-γερ-
(-ger-)

καὶ
(kai)

-μω-
(-mō-)

-ος
(-os)

οὖν
(oûn)

φησὶ
(phēsi)

== See also ==
- iota adscript, which is written with a lowercase iota: ɑι
- iota subscript, also written with a ligatured iota: ᾳ
- Tau-Rho
- Chi-Rho
- IH monogram
- IX monogram
- Orthographic ligature
- Ancient Greek Numbers, a Unicode block with numerous Greek ligatures
