= Lectionary 170 =

Lectionary ℓ 170
- New Testament manuscript
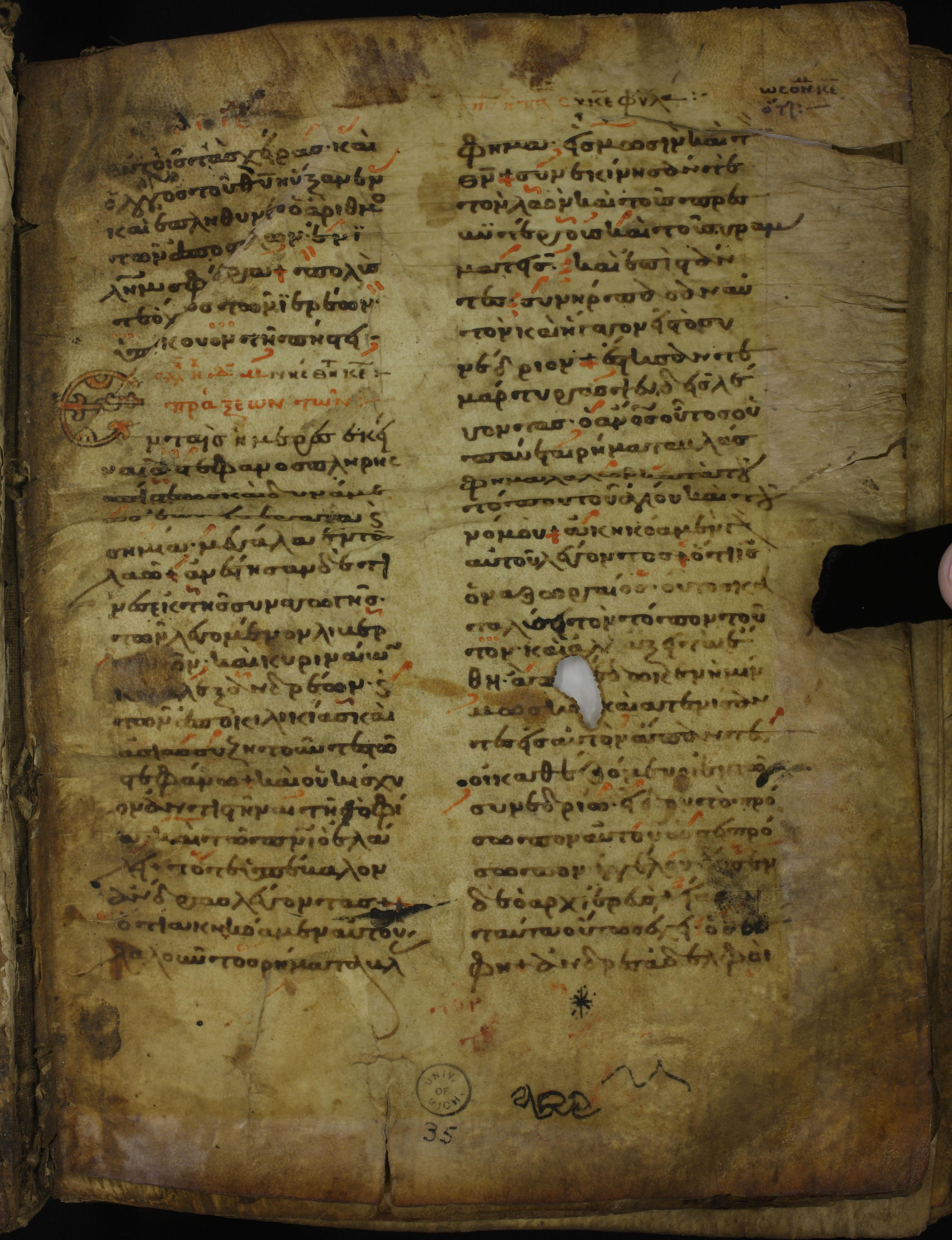
- Folio 4 recto
- Text: Apostolarion
- Date: 14th century
- Script: Greek
- Now at: Ann Arbor, Michigan
- Size: 26.4 cm by 19.7 cm
- Hand: ill written

Lectionary 170, designated by siglum ℓ 170 (in the Gregory-Aland numbering) is a Greek manuscript of the New Testament, on parchment leaves. Palaeographically it has been assigned to the 14th century. Scrivener dated it to the 12th or 13th century. Formerly it was labelled as Lectionary 68^{a}. Scrivener by 65^{a}.

== Description ==
The codex contains lessons from the Acts and Epistles lectionary (Apostolarion), on 160 parchment leaves (26.4 cm by 19.7 cm), with lacunae at the beginning and end. The text is written in Greek minuscule letters, in two columns per page, 28-29 lines per page. It is ill written. It contains musical notes in red.

The text reaches from the second Sunday after Easter, through the Ascension, Pentecost, to the sixteenth week after Pentecost. The Menology (folios 114 v – 160) has almost no lessons given at length, but overflows with rubrical directions.

== History ==
The manuscript was purchased in 1870 by Angela Burdett-Coutts. Formerly it was held in Burdett-Coutts III. 24 in London.

The manuscript was examined by C. R. Gregory, who saw it in 1883.

The manuscript is not cited in the critical editions of the Greek New Testament UBS3, but it was cited in UBS4.

Since 1922 the codex is located in the University of Michigan (Ms. 35) at Ann Arbor.

== See also ==
- List of New Testament lectionaries
- Biblical manuscript
- Textual criticism

== Bibliography ==
- Frederick Henry Ambrose Scrivener, Adversaria Critica Sacra: With a Short Explanatory Introduction (Cambridge, 1893), pp. LXXXIX-XC, 1-59. (as u)
- K. W. Clark, A Descriptive Catalogue of Greek New Testament Manuscripts i America (Chicago, 1937), pp. 313–314.
