= Henri Estienne (elder) =

French printer (1460–1520)

Henri Estienne (1460 or 1470–1520) also known as Henricus Stephanus, was a 16th-century Parisian printer. Born in Paris in 1460 or 1470, he was the son of Geoffroy d'Estienne and Laure de Montolivet. His brother Raimond d'Estienne became the heir of the Estienne family, while Henri was disinherited by his father in 1482 "for having devoted himself to printing", the profession of printer then being the cause of losing your title. Estienne established the Estienne printing firm in 1502 from his wife's deceased husband's Higman Press. After his death in 1520, his wife married his colleague Simon de Colines who took control of the Estienne Press until his son Robert Estienne assumed control of the press in 1526.

== Life ==
Henri Estienne was born in Paris in 1460 or 1470. (Note: Sources have conflicting information about whether he was born in 1460 or 1470.) Estienne married Guyonne Viart and became the director of the Higman press in 1502, which her deceased husband Jean Higman owned. He likely began printing in between 1502 and 1503, and Estienne's first work was a Latin translation of Aristotle's Ethics in 1503 or 1504. However, Estienne's works were primarily theological or scientific. He printed the Abrégé de l'Arithmétique of Boethius in 1503.

The Estienne printing studio was established on rue de l'école de Droit, where Estienne was printer-bookseller for the University of Paris. Estienne's printmark was of the old arms of the University, a shield charged with three Fleurs de Lis, with a hand emerging from a cloud and holding a closed book with the motto was: Plus olei quam vini ("more oil than wine,"). One of Estienne's frequent authors was Jacques Lefèvre d'Étaples; Estienne published his Psalterium quintuplex in 1509, his commentaries on Psalms in 1507, and commentaries on the Epistles of Paul in 1512. Moreover, these works represented one of the first instances in which the Bible was studied philologically. In addition to Estienne's collaboration with Lefèvre d'Étaples, Estienne had connections with Guillaume Budé and Guillaume Briçonnet. Beatus Rhenanus served as one of Estienne's proofreaders. Estienne took great care to avoid printing errors in his work. If any mistake occurred, he would use errata sheets to correct the error and may have been the first printer to do so. Additionally, Estienne usually indicated on his prints that they were for sale at his printing press, a practice not often followed by his son Robert Estienne.

Estienne's typography became increasingly more sophisticated by the late 1510s, more similar to the books Simon de Colines would print after Estienne's death. Estienne died in 1520. By 1520, de Colines was probably his personal assistant and therefore replaced Estienne as print director. Scholars suspect that de Colines's instant proficiency as print director of the Estienne's business suggests that he was involved with the Estienne print shop. However, there is no evidence to suggest he had ties to the shop until he assumed control of it in 1520. Along with de Colines, Estienne helped to move the printing type style from gothic to roman. Philippe Renouard attributed the Estienne print shop with publishing over 1590 editions (an average of nine per year) from 1502 to 1664.

== Publications ==
Henri Estienne's publishing company published five to ten handmade books per year. Among his publications were the editions of Aristotle, and the Psalterium quincuplex, of Lefèvre d'Estaples, 1509 & 1513, and his commentary on the Pauline Epistles in 1512. Also the Itinerarium of Antoninus, 1512; Guillaume Mara, and De Tribusfagiendis. Estienne also published an influential print of Materia medica, translated by Jean Ruel, in 1516. Estienne used a unique, distinctive font for this publication, indicating that it was a favored project of Estienne.

== Family ==
Henri Estienne had sons, François, Robert, and Charles. All of his sons were connected to Estienne's profession in some manner, but Robert was most directly tied to his father's profession and ran his father's business after he died. François became a bookseller for the University of Paris, occasionally dabbling in publishing. He published in between 1537 and 1548; however, unlike his father, none of his works were related to theology. His widow Guyonne Viart married Simon de Colines, a remarkable printer of the 16th century. He likely worked for Estienne's publishing company while Estienne was still alive. Charles Estienne was a medical scholar, even publishing some works related to medicine and natural history. After his brother, Robert Estienne fled Paris for Geneva in 1550 because of threats from the Sorbonne after he converting to Protestantism, Charles took charge of the Estienne print shop in Paris. Charles published in Paris until 1561, many of which works were small editions of various Hebrew texts.
