= Stigma (ligature) =

Ligature of Greek alphabet letters sigma and tau

Stigma (ϛ) is a ligature of the Greek letters sigma (Σ) and tau (Τ), which was used in writing Greek between the Middle Ages and the 19th century. It is also used as a numeral symbol for the number 6. In this unrelated function, it is a continuation of the old letter digamma (originally Ϝ, cursive form), which had served as a numeral since antiquity and was conflated with the σ-τ ligature in the minuscule handwriting of the Middle Ages.

== History and use ==
The στ ligature was one of many ligature forms that came into widespread use as part of the minuscule writing style of Greek from the 9th and 10th centuries onwards. It is based on the lunate form (Ϲ) of the letter sigma.

With many other ligatures, it was used to print Greek during the early-modern era. Between the 18th and 19th centuries, the use of ligatures in print gradually diminished. The στ ligature was among the last to go, around the middle of the 19th century.

The name, stigma (στίγμα), is originally a common Greek noun meaning "a mark, dot, puncture", or generally "a sign", from the verb στίζω ("[I] puncture"). The related but distinct word stigme (στιγμή) is the classical and post-classical word for "geometric point; punctuation mark". Stigma was co-opted as a name specifically for the στ sign, evidently because of the acrophonic value of its initial st- as well as the analogy with the name of sigma.

The numeral symbol, originally quite unrelated to the στ ligature, developed from the letter Ϝ, which stood for the sound /w/ in early pre-classical forms of the Greek alphabet. This symbol became obsolete as a letter during the classical era but remained part of the Greek alphabet-based system of numerals, where its value of 6 corresponded to its original place in the alphabet. In its handwritten forms, its shape changed from through to or during the Hellenistic era and late antiquity. Originally called wau, it was called digamma in classical Greek and episemon during the Byzantine era. It was conflated with the στ ligature owing to the accidental similarities of their shapes. The association between the numeral 6 and the letter sequence στ became so strong that today, in Greece, the letter sequence ΣΤʹ or στʹ is often used in lieu of ϛʹ itself to write the number 6.

In modern practice, the term stigma is often applied to the symbol ϛ both in its function as a ligature and as a numeral, whereas the term digamma is normally used for the ancient letter representing /w/, which appears in modern print as Ϝ or ϝ (the form has a large number of close variants).

In modern typefaces, lowercase stigma is similar in appearance to final sigma (ς), but the top loop tends to be larger, and extends further to the right. It can normally be distinguished from final sigma in the context, because the combination στ never occurs at the end of a word, and conversely the final sigma form ς never occurs inside a word and is never used as a numeral either. Uppercase forms of stigma as a numeral (Ϛ) are rare in practice; when they occur, they can often be confused with uppercase forms of another numeral symbol, koppa (Ϟ ϟ), which stands for 90.

Stigma is encoded in Unicode as:

- U+03DA Ϛ GREEK LETTER STIGMA
- U+03DB ϛ GREEK SMALL LETTER STIGMA
