= Robert Estienne =

French printer (1503–1559)

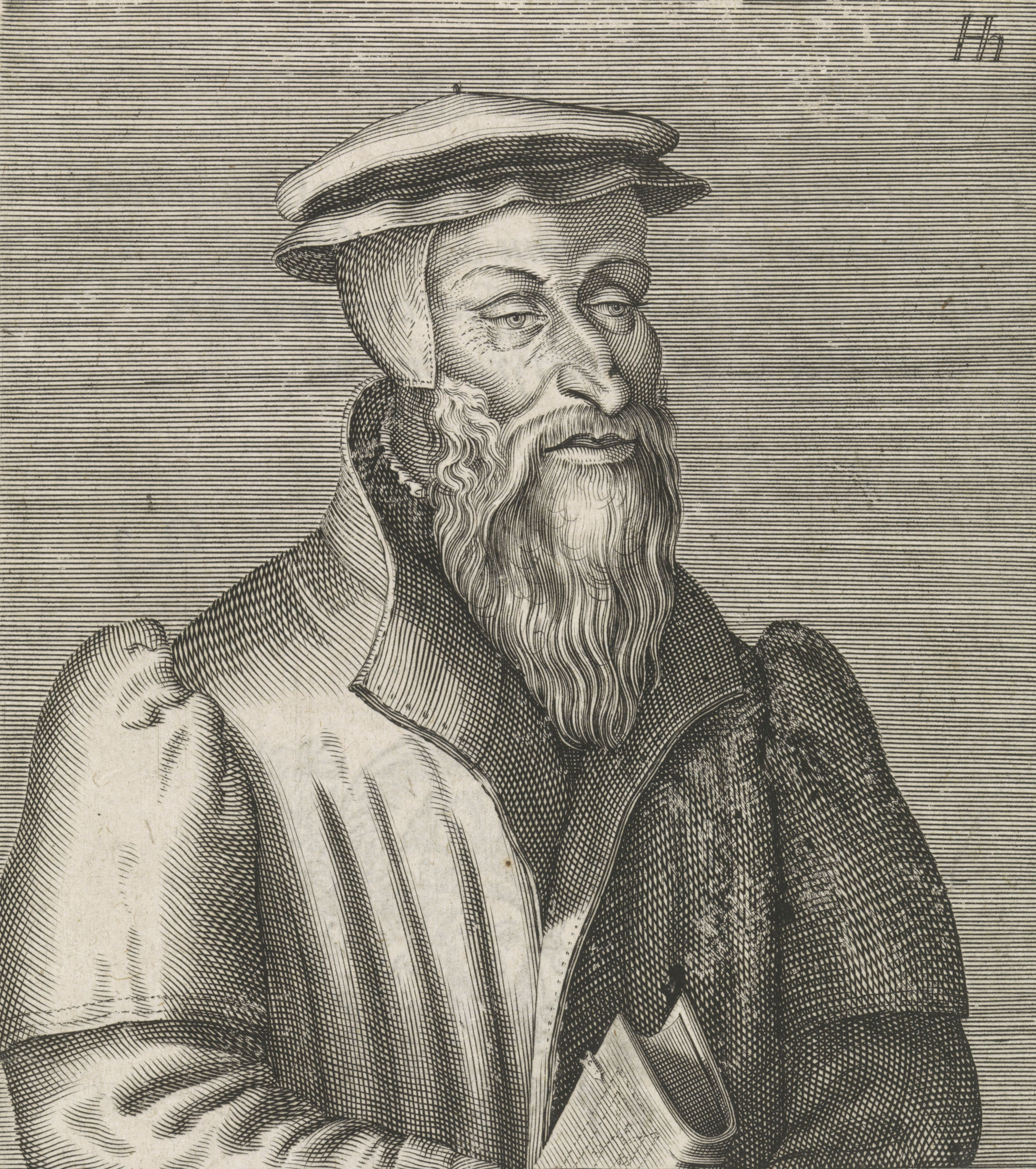
- Portrait of Estienne from Hendrik Hondius's Icones virorum nostra patrumque memoria illustrium (1599)
- Born: Robert Estienne; 1503; Paris, Kingdom of France
- Died: 7 September 1559 (aged 55–56); Geneva, Republic of Geneva
- Other names: Robert Stephanus, Robert Stephens, Roberti Stephani
- Citizenship: French, Genevan (since 1556)
- Occupations: Humanist, printer, publisher
- Known for: Publishing the Thesaurus linguae latinae, creating the most common chapter and verse divisions for the Bible

Robert I Estienne (French: [etjɛn]; 1503 – 7 September 1559), known as Robertus Stephanus in Latin and sometimes referred to as Robert Stephens, was a French 16th-century printer in Paris. He was the proprietor of the Estienne print shop after the death of his father Henri Estienne, the founder of the Estienne printing firm. Estienne published and republished many classical texts as well as Greek and Latin translations of the Bible. Known as "Printer to the King" in Latin, Hebrew, and Greek, Estienne's most prominent work was the Thesaurus linguae latinae which is considered to be the foundation of modern Latin lexicography. Additionally, he was the first to print the New Testament divided into standard numbered verses.

Raised a Catholic, he became a Protestant late in his life. Many of his published Bibles included commentary which upset the Catholic theologians of the Sorbonne who sought to censor Estienne's work. Eventually, overcome by the prejudice of the Sorbonne, Estienne and his family fled to Geneva where he continued his printing uncensored, publishing many of the works of John Calvin. In 1556 he became a citizen of Geneva, where he would die on 7 September 1559.

Of Estienne's four sons, two became accomplished printers, one of whom was Henri Estienne who continued the legacy of his grandfather Estienne's printing firm. Along with other printers, Estienne contributed to the "Golden Age of French Typography".

== Biography ==
=== Early life ===
Robert Estienne was born in Paris in 1503. The second son of the famous humanist printer Henri Estienne, he became knowledgeable in Latin, Greek, and Hebrew. After his father's death in 1520, the Estienne printing establishment was maintained by his father's former partner Simon de Colines who also married Estienne's mother, the widow Estienne. As Estienne was not yet of age at the time of his father's death, Colines and Gilles Nepveu (the husband or fiancé of his sister Nicole) became his legal guardians. Estienne and Colines likely collaborated in Estienne print shop for a time. Colines was known for his exquisite type cutting, whereas Estienne was known for his accuracy.

In 1526, Robert Estienne assumed control of his father's printing shop while Colines established his own firm nearby. The parties agreed to divide the house, printing equipment, and printing supplies in half. Colines moved his shop down the street from the Estienne shop. Though the nature of their relationship after this is largely unknown, scholars suggest that they had mutual respect for one another and may have continued to collaborate, sharing fonts and materials. Even though Estienne reestablished his father's printing shop in 1526, his first independent project as a scholar-printer can be traced back to 1524. He was in the process of publishing a Latin version of the Bible as he searched Paris for manuscripts. He had already printed a New Testament, and some slight alterations which he had introduced into the text brought upon him the censures of the faculty of theology. It was the first of a long series of disputes between him and that body. Around this time, he apparently joined the Reformed Church.

Estienne married Perrette Badius in 1526 whose father Josse Badius Ascensius owned a print shop, giving Estienne the resources to print that he lacked from his father's materials alone. After her father's death in 1535, Estienne merged the Estienne and Badius printing business. His first Biblia or version of the Vulgate Bible was published in 1527. While he was working on the Bible, he increased his revenue and reputation by publishing a series of octavos, which in this case were small, inexpensive educational books from scholars such as Cicero and Lucian. Estienne's trade was primarily as printer-bookseller and though he did publish his own prints, he did not publish in partnership with other printers as was a common practice for printers of the time.

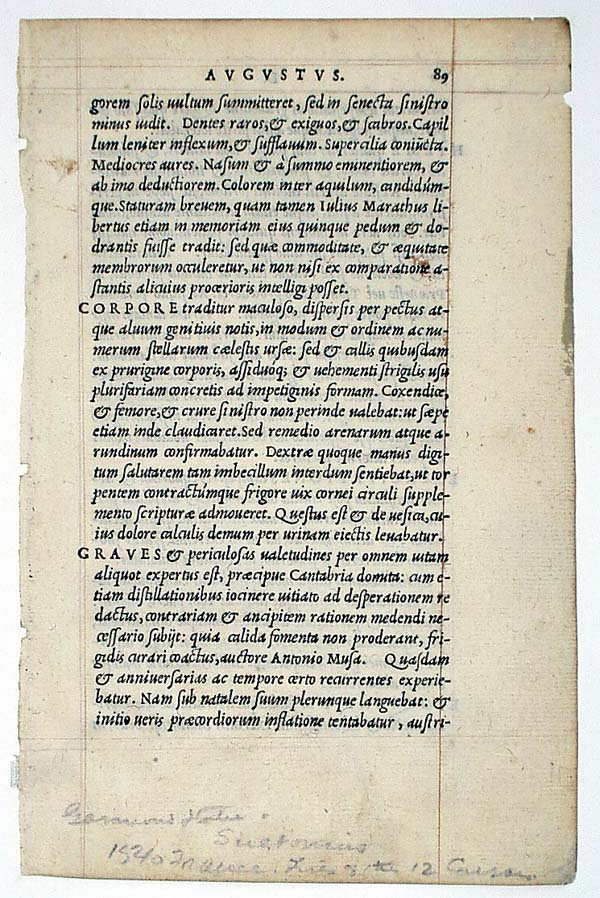
Suetonius, Lives of the Twelve Caesars

=== Latin classics ===
With his title of "royal typographer" Robert Estienne promoted the Estienne print shop by his numerous editions of grammatical works and other schoolbooks (among them many of Melanchthon's) and of classical and Patristic authors, such as Dio Cassius, Cicero, Sallust, Julius Caesar, Justin, Socrates Scholasticus, and Sozomen. During the first fifteen years of his career, Estienne focused his printing on five Latin classic authors, specifically, Cicero, Terence, Plautus, Pliny, and Virgil. He printed works from Horace and Persisus, but he printed them far less frequently. He nearly tripled the number of authors' works he published from 1541 to 1545. Scholars suggest that Estienne's trouble with his published Bibles and the Catholic Church led him to publish more authors of Latin Classics as a buffer.

Many of Estienne's published classics, especially the Greek editions (which were printed with typefaces made by Claude Garamond), were famous for their typographical elegance. The editiones principes issued from Estienne's press were eight in number. He began with the Historia ecclesiastica (1544) and ended with Appian (1551). The last was completed after Estienne's departure from Paris by his brother Charles and appeared under Charles's name. Estienne also printed numerous editions of Latin classics, of which the folio Virgil of 1532 is the most noteworthy. He printed a large number of Latin grammars and other educational works, many of which were written by Mathurin Cordier, his friend and co-worker in the cause of humanism. He was trained as a punchcutter, but no font has been identified as his. Estienne did, however, oversee the work of the best punchcutters of the time such as Claude Garamond and Guillaume Le Bé. Under Estienne, Garamond designed the Greek type used by the King of France which was used to print the first edition of Roman History. Consequently, Estienne was the first printer granted permission to use the grecs du roi or Greek types of the king. In the 1530s Estienne's printing represents the first use of apostrophes and grave and acute accents in France. Moreover, Estienne was known as one of the printers responsible for adapting the Aldine roman type in France.

=== Dictionaries ===
One of the best printers of his time, Robert Estienne was asked to either compile a dictionary from the best Latin authors or make one himself; in 1531 he published his Thesaurus linguae latinae, which is considered by some scholars to be the foundation of modern Latin lexicography. Moreover, this dictionary made Estienne the "father of French lexicography". He had worked on it for two years, with the assistance only of Thierry of Beauvais. It was 964 pages and was improved in 1536 and 1543 in three volumes. Considered his "greatest monument of Latin scholarship", he employed research assistants for the 1543 version: Andreas Gruntleus, Gerardus Clericus, and Adam Nodius.

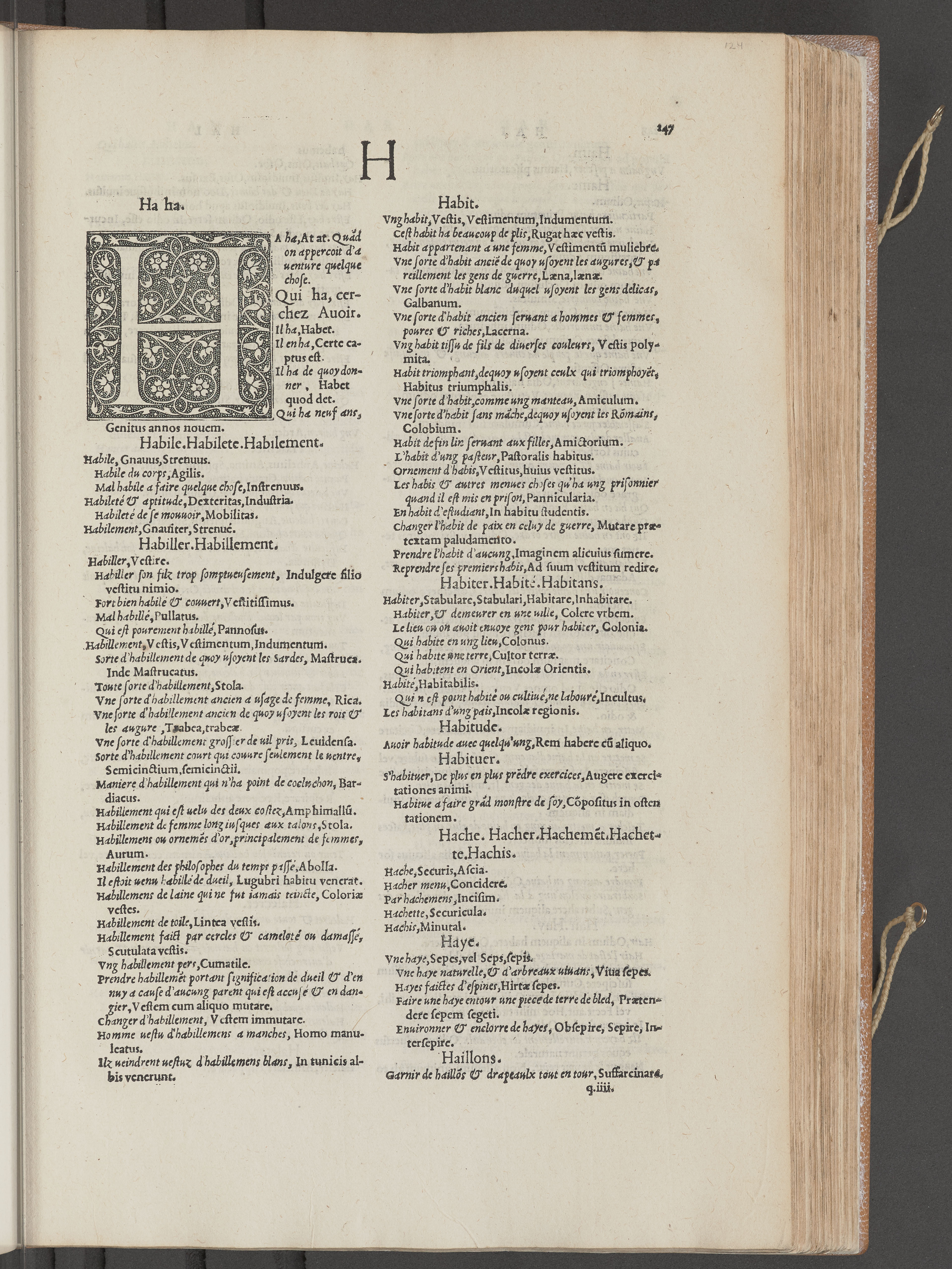
Page from Robert Estienne's 1549 Dictionaire françois latin

From his work on the Thesaurus linguae latinae, he published Dictionarium latino-gallicum in 1538 and Dictionaire françoislatin in 1540. These dictionaries were superior to others at the time because non-classical elements had been edited out; when determining words, they were checked for correctness and applicability in context; and citations were exclusively from classical authors. Furthermore, it applied consistency to word order since lexicographers disagreed about whether words should be ordered alphabetically or etymologically. Estienne's thesaurus was alphabetical based on the first three letters of the word, then grouped etymologically. In the 1540s, he began publishing more concise school dictionaries. Many of these dictionaries were translated into other languages such as German and Flemish. From 1528 to 1580, he published several editions of Alphabetum graecum, a representation of Renaissance Greek orthography.

=== Religious texts ===
Although Robert Estienne was printing Bibles in Latin as early as 1528, he printed his first of four Greek New Testament texts in 1546. Despite its similarity to the works of Erasmus, Estienne did not credit Erasmus, but rather claimed to be influenced by ancient codices. The first two editions were small books with beautiful Greek texts, called O mirificam. The third and most significant is known as the Editio Regia or the "Royal Edition", published in 1550 for King Henri II. Typographically, it is significant because the Greek font made by Garamond became the most widely-used Greek typeface for European printers. In it he combined over 15 Greek sources with annotations in the margins. The 1550 version was the basis for the Textus Receptus, the standard Greek text for many generations.

The 1551 edition contains Erasmus's Latin translation and the Vulgate. Scholars have described his editing of the Vulgate as mediocre and lacking in effort or depth. In this edition of the Vulgate, Estienne introduced the division of the New Testament into chapter and verses for the first time.

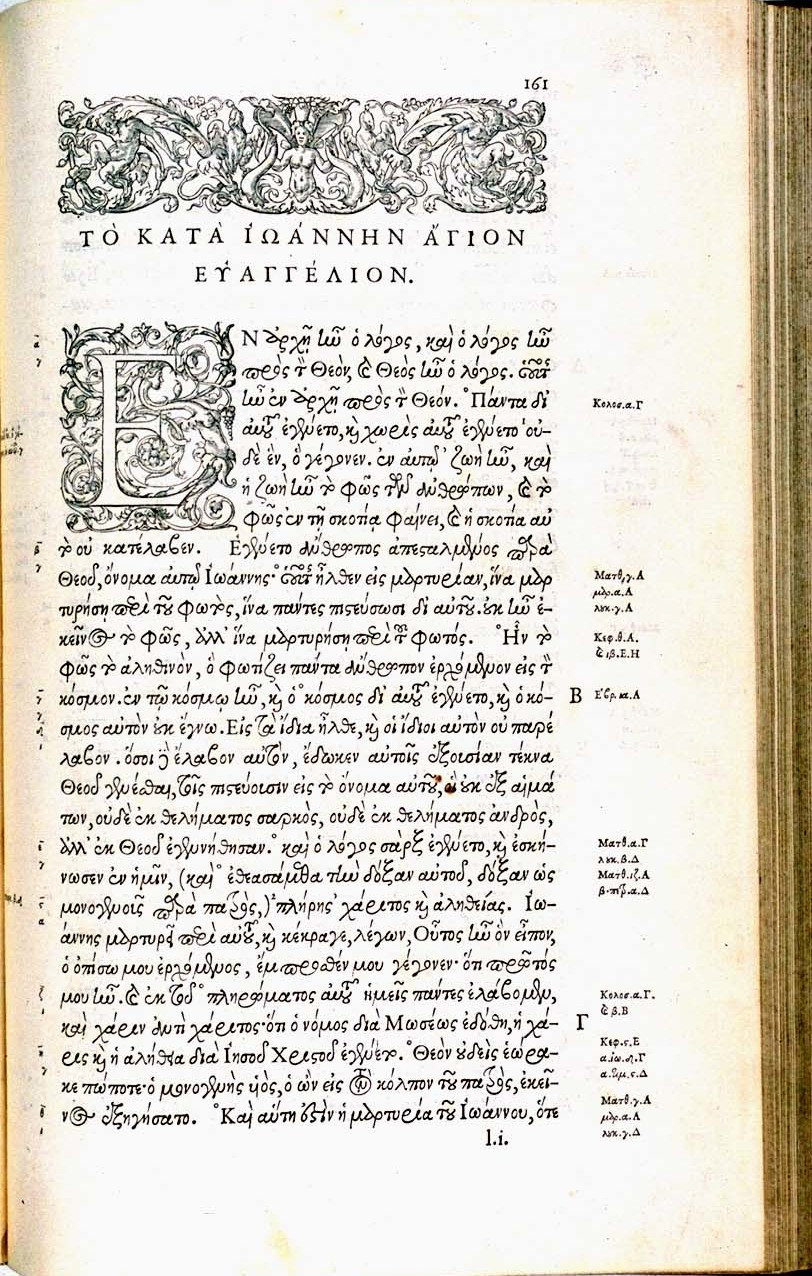
A page from Estienne's 1550 version of the New Testament using Garamond's Grecs du roi

After he finished the Vulgate, he began developing his style. He was interested in working on original texts rather than translations. Additionally, he was interested in writing commentaries to help an average reader understand the academic texts to the point of adding his own interpretation. Moreover, Estienne's commentary in the fourth edition of the Greek New Testament initiated the antagonism of the Sorbonne against Estienne.

He published two editions of the Hebrew Bible: one in 13 volumes and another one in 10 volumes. Estienne acquired Vulgate manuscripts while in Paris and printed a number of editions throughout his career. The principal editions are the 1527, 1532, 1540 (one of the ornaments of his press), and 1546. In the 1532 edition, he placed the Acts in between the gospels and epistles of Paul as is standard in most Bibles. Before this, the Acts were usually found at the end. Furthermore, typographer and printing historian Stanley Morison claimed that Estienne's 1532 folio Bible contained, "what is probably the finest use ever made of [the Garamond] letter." Estienne printed this edition of the Bible in a grand folio format; his expected buyers were the nobility and the wealthy rather than the university faculty/students. Though in 1543, his style shifted to that of sextodecimo format, printing Bibles in Latin, Greek, and Hebrew, which assumes the buyers are students and professors.

His editions, especially that of 1546, containing a new translation at the side of the Vulgate, was the subject of sharp and acrimonious criticism from the clergy. In 1539 he received the distinguishing title of "Printer to the king" for Latin and Hebrew, and later for Greek. (Note: Despite Estienne's access to the grecs du roi, printer Conrad Neobar was appointed "Printer to the king" in Greek in 1539. After Neobar's death in 1540, Estienne took the title of "Printer to the king" in Greek upon himself, without ever being officially given the title) This incited anger from the Sorbonne because Estienne had converted from Catholicism to Protestantism. The Sorbonne was opposed to the humanist ideals of the time and was attempting to censor Estienne's publishing firm. He was protected by Francis I of France with whom he enjoyed strong patronage and friendship; Estienne aided Francis I in printing documents ratifying policies which established and justified his power. Later, Estienne published a document to inform the public how alliances between French royalty, German Protestants, and Turkish royalty were beneficial for European religious peace. In 1538, Francis I requested that Estienne give a copy of every Greek book he had printed to create the royal library, which became the first copyright library. However, after Francis I died in 1547 and was succeeded by Henry II, Estienne fled to Geneva in late 1551, after his religious texts became too controversial in the face of Catholic censors. With him he brought his printing material, including his Greek type made by Garamond.

=== Geneva ===
On his arrival at Geneva, he first printed the fourth edition of his Greek New Testament, followed by a defense against the attacks of the Sorbonne in 1552 called his Réponse. It was first published in Latin. He later translated it into French and published it again. The central theme of his Réponse is that the Sorbonne had a great ability to persuade or intimidate people. Estienne established his printing firm in Geneva and his brother Charles helped run the firm in Paris. However, after Charles died in a debtors' prison, Robert II (the son of Robert I) took over the business. In Geneva, Estienne issued the French Bible in 1553 and many of John Calvin's writings, including the Institutio in 1553. His 1556 edition of the Latin Bible contained the translation of the Old Testament by Santes Pagninus and the first edition of Theodore Beza's Latin edition of the New Testament. In 1556 he became a citizen of the Republic of Geneva, where he died on 7 September 1559. Estienne's other sons, Henri II and François, helped Estienne run the shop in Geneva after the death of Estienne. Robert Estienne was one of the most successful printers in the Estienne family, and one of the best scholars of the time. It was in part, due to Estienne that the reign of Francis I was considered the "Golden Age of French Typography".

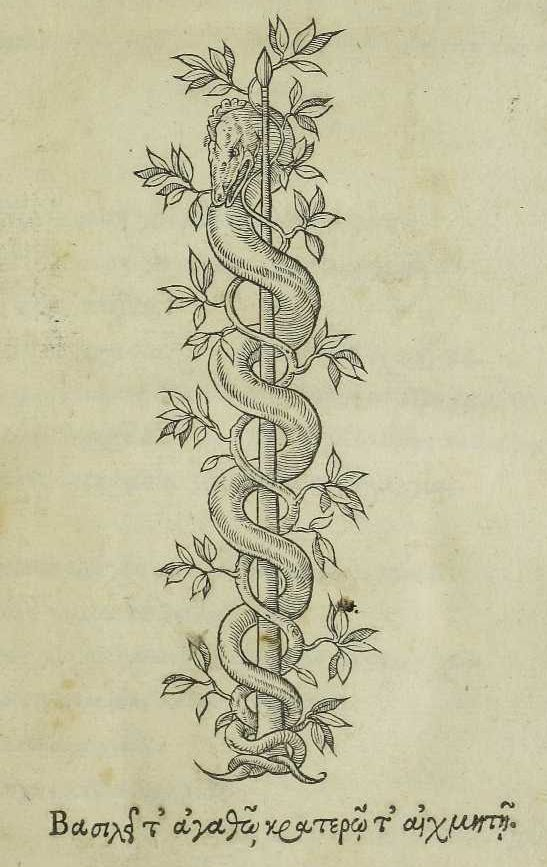
Robert Estienne's mark (BEIC)

== Pressmarks ==
Robert Estienne used several pressmarks or devices on his prints. Estienne's pressmark with an olive branch and a serpent wound around a spear was first seen in 1544 on the title page of Preparatio Evangelica. It was symbolic of wisdom in times of war and peace. The motto below "Βασιλεῖ τ’ ἀγαθῷ κρατερῷ τ’ αἰχμητῇ" translates to "to the wise king and the valiant warrior". Another device was called Oliva Stephanorum or the olive of the Stephens family with the words of Romans 11:20, Noli altum sapere ("Do not be proud") and later Noli altum sapere, sed time ... ("Be not high-minded but fear"). The device shows a man standing by an olive tree. Scholars believe this man is Paul the Apostle who is affirming the importance of faith. This is consistent with Estienne's connection to the Protestant Reformation. The olive tree is meant to represent the tree of knowledge. The device may have been a subtle attack on the Catholic theologians at the Sorbonne for their "lack of humility". Pressmarks function best when they are immediately recognized, and scholars criticize Estienne's pressmarks for not being easily recognizable.

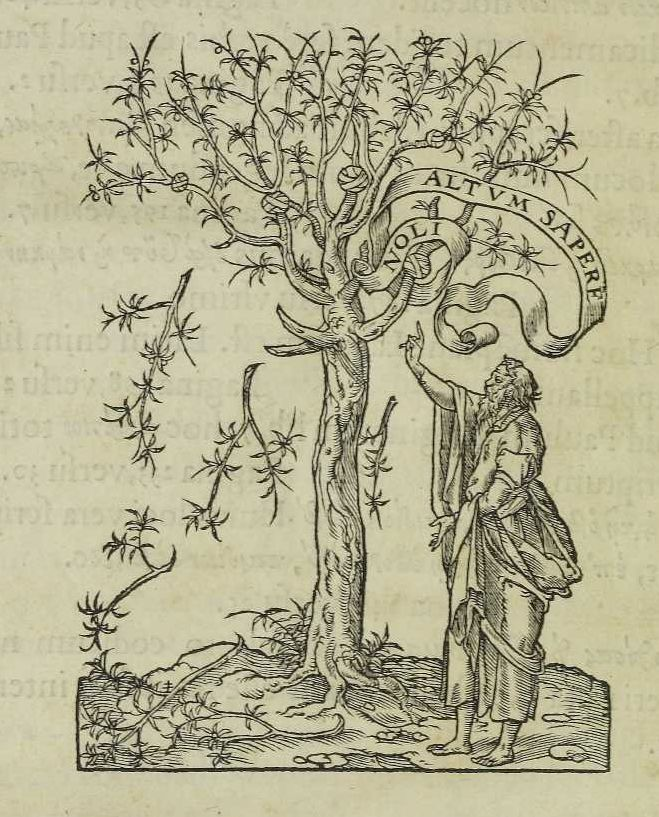
Robert Estienne's mark (BEIC)

== Family ==
Robert Estienne encouraged his four sons to study and perfect his professions. His will indicated that he wished all of his sons follow in his profession. Two of Robert's sons, Henri and Robert became successful printers. François (born 1540) printed in Geneva from 1562 to 1582. As well as issuing editions of the Bible in Latin and French, he published some of Calvin's works.

Robert Estienne II (1530–1570) studied Hebrew as his father recommended. Uninterested in the Reformation, he stayed in Paris instead of following his father to Geneva, opening his own printing shop in 1556. He earned the title of Typographus regius in 1563. He printed the New Testament of 1568–1569, a reprint of his father's first edition. He printed the Decalogue in Hebrew and Aramaic in 1566. Additionally, Estienne printed books in Hebrew for professors in Paris, but fled to Geneva in 1569, because he worked for Anglican clients. He died in 1570.

== See also ==
- Chapters and verses of the Bible
