= Angelo Vergecio =

Greek copyist

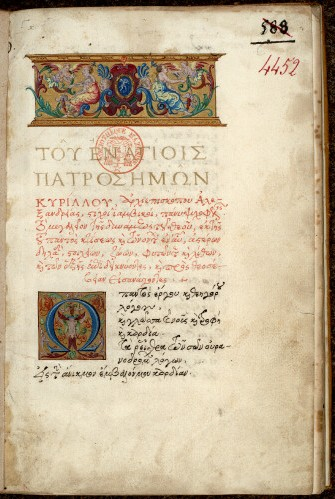
Title page of the Hexameron, copied by Vergecio

Angelo Vergecio (Greek: Άγγελος Βεργέκιος, French: Ange Vergèce; 1505–1569) was a Greek copyist from Crete active in Venice and France. He became a royal scribe for Francis I of France and his successors, was responsible for copying over fifty Greek manuscripts, and played a role in the dissemination of Greek among the humanist circles in France. His handwriting formed the basis of the grecs du roi typeface designed by Claude Garamond.

== Bibliography ==
- Alphonse Dain. « La fille d’Ange Vergèce », Humanisme et Renaissance 1 (1934) p. 133-144.
- Alphonse Dain. « Commerce et copie de manuscrits grecs », Humanisme et Renaissance 4 (1937) p. 395-410.
- Charles Delattre. Nommer le monde : origine des noms de fleuves, de montagnes et de ce qui s'y trouve. Villeneuve-d'Ascq : Presses universitaires du Septentrion, 2011.
- Ernst Gamillscheg, Dieter Harlfinger and Herbert Hunger (dir.) Repertorium der griechischen Kopisten 800-1600, Veröffentlichungen der Kommission für Byzantinistik 3-1, Vienna : Österreichische Akademie der Wissenschaften, 1981.
- Philip Hofer et G. W. Cottrell Jr. « Angelos Vergecios and the bestiary of Manuel Philes », Harvard Library Bulletin 8 (1954) p. 323–339.
- Marie-Pierre Laffitte. Reliures royales du Département des Manuscrits (1515-1559). Paris : BNF, 2001.
- Marie-Pierre Laffitte. « Manuscrits de la famille Vergèce en reliures à médaillons peints (1554-1569) », Revue de la Bibliothèque nationale de France 12 (2002), p. 25-31.
- Émile Legrand. « Ange Vergèce », Bibliographie hellénique. Paris : 1885. t. I, pp. cxxv-cxxxvi.
- Pierre de Nolhac. Ronsard et l'humanisme. Paris : Champion, 1921, p. 39.
- Henri Omont. Catalogues des manuscrits grecs de Fontainebleau sous François Ier et Henri II. Paris : Imprimerie nationale, 1889. 4°, XXXIX-466 p.
- Henri Omont. « Procès d’Ange Vergèce au Châtelet et au Parlement de Paris (1561) », Bibliothèque de l’École des Chartes 77 (1916) pp. 516–520.
- Glenn Peers, « Forging Byzantine animals : Manuel Philes in Renaissance France », Rivista di studi bizantini e neoellenici 49 (2012), pp. 79–103.
- Glenn Peers. « Thinking with Animals: Byzantine natural history in sixteenth-century France », Bibliothèque d’Humanisme et Renaissance 68 (2006), pp. 457–484.
- Glenn Peers. « A Cretan in Paris : Angelos Vergekios and Greek natural history in the French Renaissance », Pepragmena Th’ Diethnous Kretologikou Synedriou. Elounta, 1-6 Oktovriou 2001. Tomos B2: Architetektonike, Istoria tes Technes, Nomismatike, Topographia kai Topiographia, Diepistemonikes Symvoles, Herakleion, 2004 (2006), p. 419-440.
