= Greek minuscule =

Handwritten script of medieval and early modern Greek

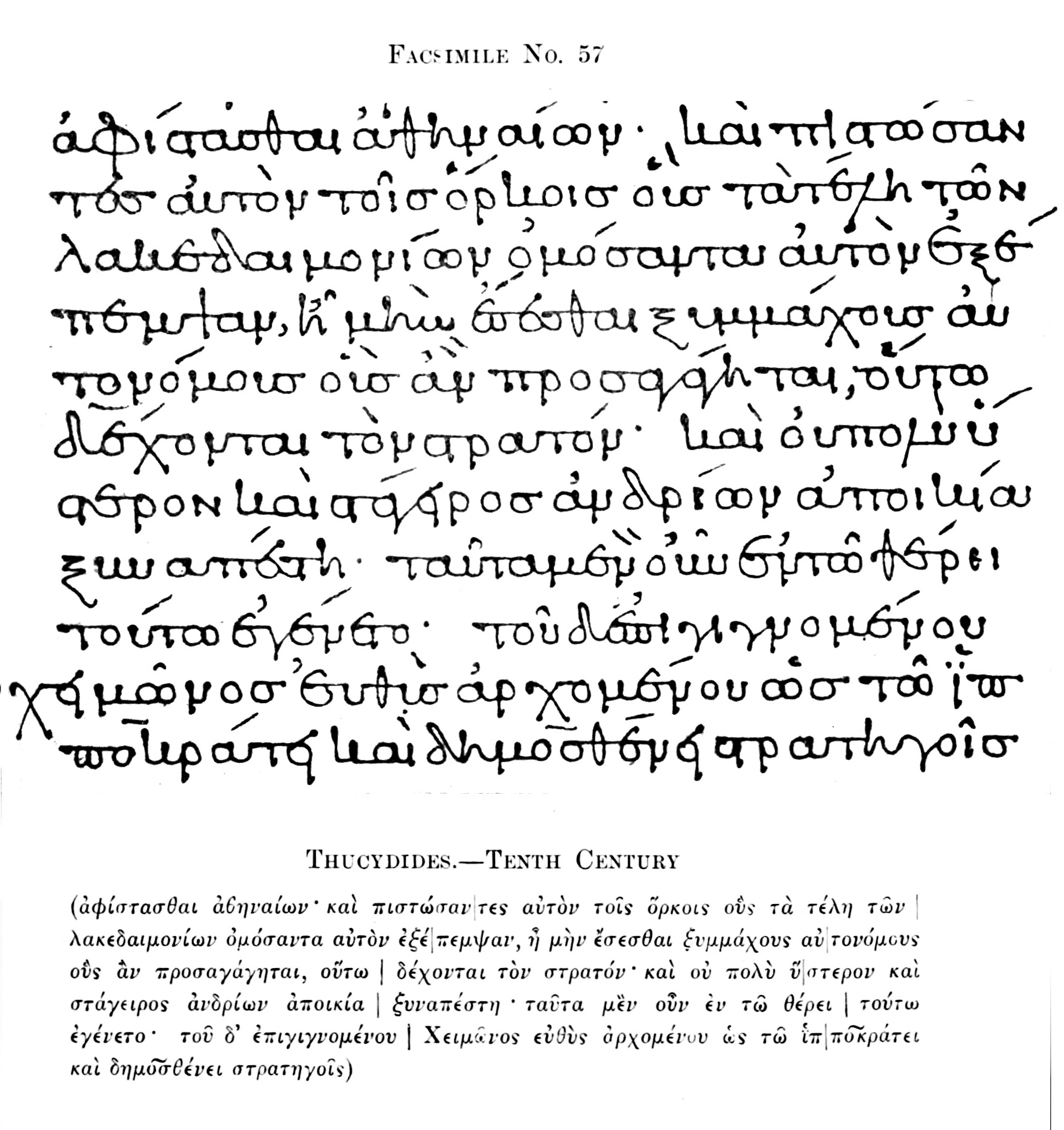
Earliest type of minuscule writing, from a 10th-century manuscript of Thucydides.

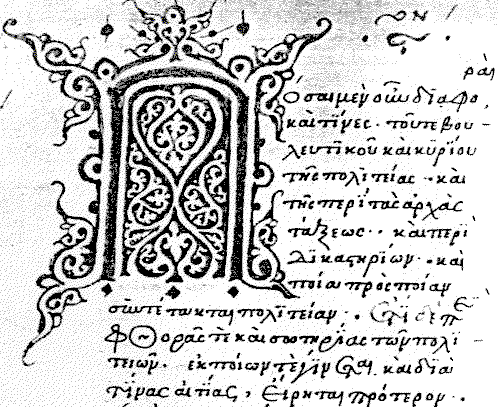
Later minuscule, 15th-century manuscript of Aristotle.

Greek minuscule was a Greek writing style which was developed as a book hand in Byzantine manuscripts during the 9th and 10th centuries. It replaced the earlier style of uncial writing, from which it differed in using smaller, more rounded and more connected letter forms, and in using many ligatures. Many of these forms had previously developed as parts of more informal cursive writing. The basic letter shapes used in the minuscule script are the ancestors of modern lower case Greek letters.

From the 10th century onwards, most Byzantine manuscripts of classical and early Christian Greek works were gradually rewritten in the new minuscule style, and few of the older uncial manuscripts were preserved. For this reason, uncial manuscripts are today extremely rare, while early minuscule manuscripts are often the oldest preserved sources attesting an ancient work and may therefore be of central importance for its philological study. Manuscripts from the oldest phase of minuscule writing (mid-9th to mid-10th century) are known in scholarship today as codices vetustissimi ("oldest codices"). Those from the mid-10th to the mid-12th centuries are known as codices vetusti ("old codices"), and later ones as codices recentiores ("newer codices").

Minuscule writing remained in use for handwriting throughout the Byzantine and into the post-Byzantine era. In the modern era, western printers used minuscule book hands as a model for developing early Greek print fonts. As with Latin, it became common to mix minuscule writing with some uncial or capital letters, with the latter used for emphasis, in titles and initials. From this practice, the modern orthographic system of letter case for Greek arose. In modern Greek writing, the upper case letters are generally modeled on the letter shapes of ancient inscriptions, while the lower case letters are based on the tradition of minuscule handwriting.

Majuscule	Uncial	Cursive	Minuscule	Minuscule with ligatures	Modern lower case
Α	inline	inline	inline	inline	α
Β	inline	inline	inline		β
Γ	inline	inline	inline	inline	γ
Δ	inline	inline	inline	inline	δ
Ε	inline	inline	inline	inline	ε
Ζ	inline	inline	inline		ζ
Η	inline	inline	inline	inline	η
Θ	inline	inline	inline	inline	θ
Ι	inline	inline	inline		ι
Κ	inline	inline	inline	inline	κ
Λ	inline	inline	inline	inline	λ
Μ	inline	inline	inline	inline	μ
Ν	inline	inline	inline	inline	ν
Ξ	inline	inline	inline		ξ
Ο	inline	inline	inline	inline	ο
Π	inline	inline	inline	inline	π
Ρ	inline	inline	inline	inline	ρ
Σ	inline	inline	inline	inline	σ
Τ	inline	inline	inline	inline	τ
Υ	inline	inline	inline	inline	υ
Φ	inline	inline	inline	inline	φ
Χ	inline	inline	inline		χ
Ψ	inline	inline	inline		ψ
Ω	inline	inline	inline	inline	ω

== See also ==
- Greek ligatures
- Stigma (letter) a ligature of sigma and tau
- Kai (conjunction) a ligature compared to & in Latin
- Grecs du roi a Greek typeface that contains large number of ligatures
