= Guillaume Le Bé =

French publisher and type designer (1525–1598)

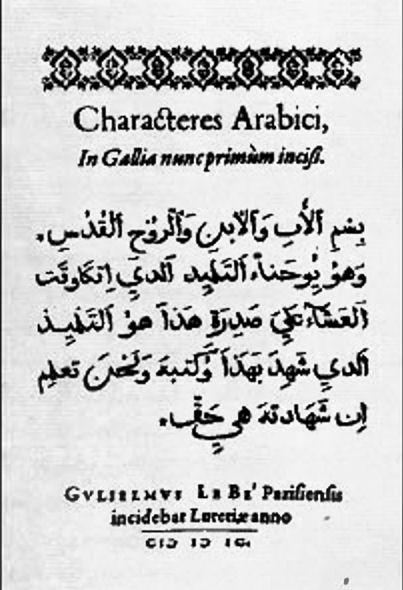
Guillaume Le Bé, 1599.

Guillaume Le Bé (French pronunciation: [ɡijom lə be]; 1525–1598) was a French punchcutter and engraver who specialised in Hebrew typefaces.

He was born in Troyes to a family of paper merchants and apprenticed to Robert Estienne in Paris. After completing his apprenticeship, he was active in Venice from c. 1540 to 1550, where he produced Hebrew, Latin and Greek types for various printer/publishers, including Marc'Antonio Giustiniani, Carlo Querini and Meir di Parenzo.

On his return to France, he established a type foundry which lasted through two generations until the 18th century. Le Bé supplied type to Christophe Plantin in Antwerp and left two annotated scrapbooks of his and other typefaces, which are in the Bibliothèque Nationale in Paris. He also supplied music type to the publishing house of Robert Ballard (his son-in-law) and Adrien Le Roy in the 1550s. This type was used well into the 18th century, when Christophe Ballard ran the publishing house.

The typographical symbol guillemet is named after him.

== See also ==
- France-Asia relations
