= Ferdinando de' Medici =

Ferdinando de' Medici may refer to various members of the Medici ruling family of Tuscany:

- Ferdinando I de' Medici, Grand Duke of Tuscany (1549–1609)
- Ferdinando II de' Medici, Grand Duke of Tuscany (1610–1670)
- Ferdinando de' Medici, Grand Prince of Tuscany (1663–1713)

== See also ==
- Ferdinand, Grand Duke of Tuscany (disambiguation)
