= Vervliet =

Vervliet is a surname. Notable people with the surname include:

- Maria Rosseels (1916–2005), Belgian writer, who used the pen name "E. M. Vervliet"
- H. D. L. Vervliet (1923–2020), Belgian librarian and historian
