= Medici Oriental Press =

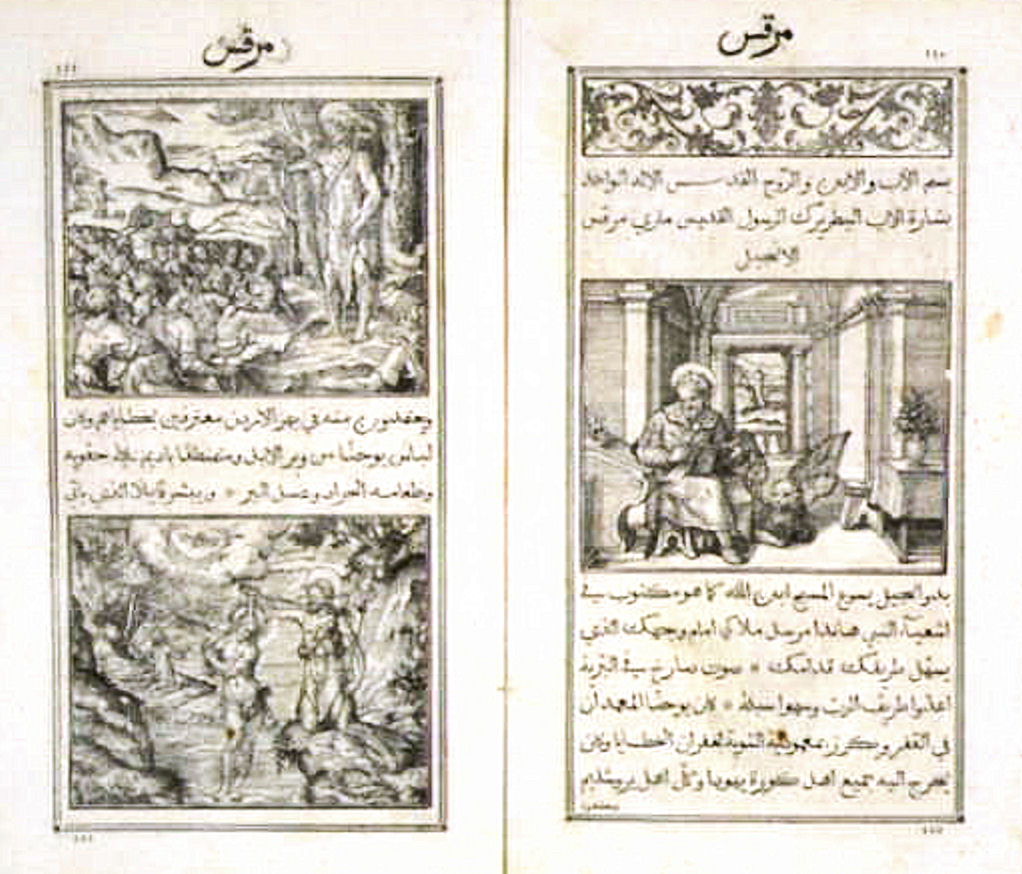
Evangelium Sanctum Domini Nostri Jesu Christi in Arabic, 1590, with Arabic types of Robert Granjon, Typographia Medicea, Rome.

The Medici Oriental Press (also Typographia Medicea) was a press established by Ferdinand de Medici in the 16th century. This press produced some of the earliest books printed in Arabic. The press was active from 1584 to 1614.

The press initially benefited from the oriental manuscripts contributed by Ignatius Nemet Allah I, Patriarch of the Syriac Orthodox Patriarch of Antioch, then in exile in Italy.

The Medici Oriental Press published Christian religious works in oriental languages, such as the Gospels which were printed in Arabic in 1591, with the objective of converting Muslims.

The Press also produced scientific books in the original Arabic language, possibly for European scientist to gain direct access to Arabic works.

The Press received from the Pope a monopoly to print books in "foreign languages".

Robert Granjon of Paris (who also worked for the Typographia Vaticana) was employed to cut Oriental typefaces, and Giovan Battista Raimondi from Cremona was designated as the manager of the Press.

== Publications ==
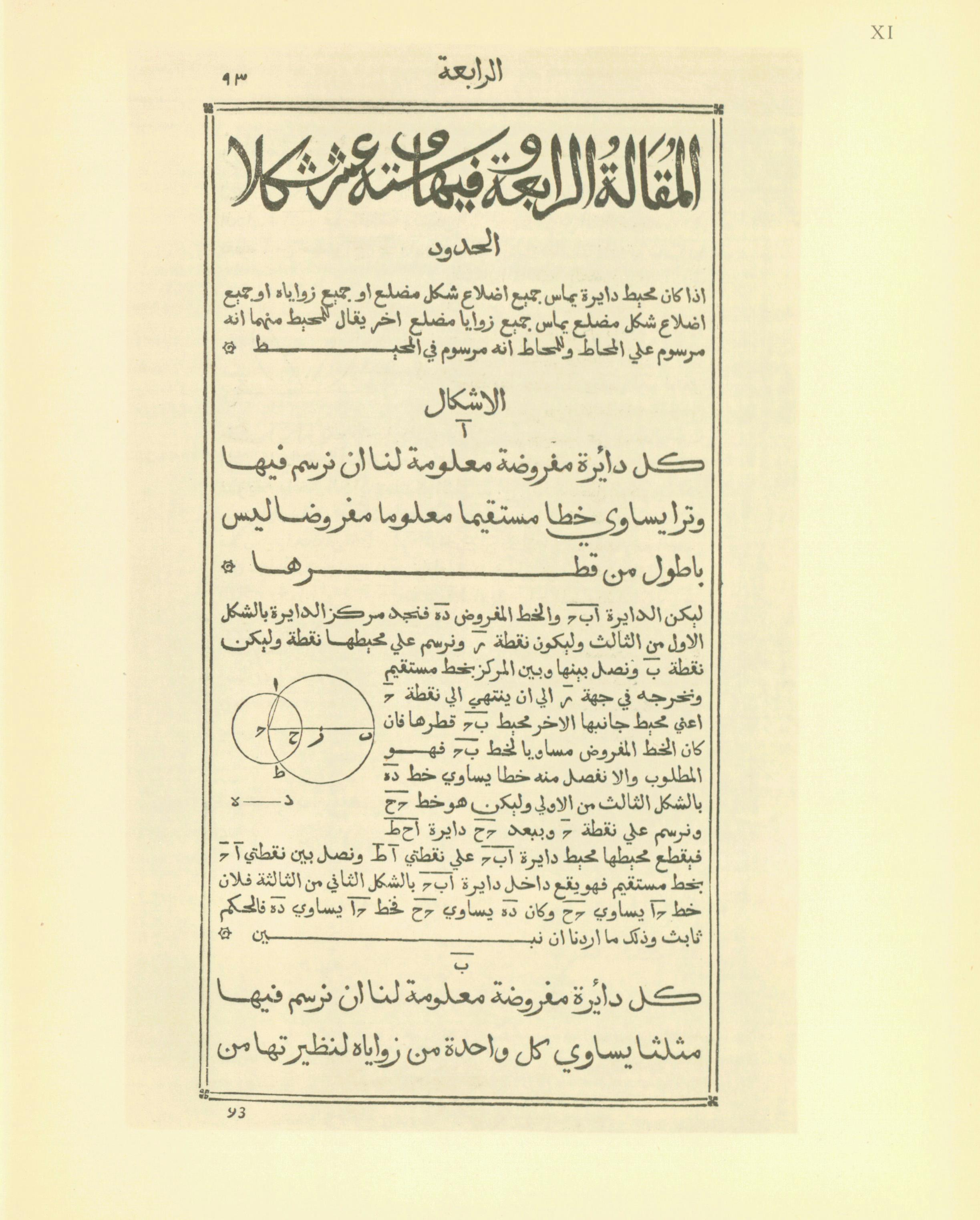
Nasir al-Din al-Tusi's version of Euclid's Elements, Typographia Medicea, Rome, 1594.

- Euangelium sanctum Domini Nostri Iesu Christi conscriptum a quatuor euangelistis sanctis idest, Mattheo, Marco, Luca, et Iohanne. Romae: in Typographia Medicea, (1590-)1591
- Alphabetum Arabicum. Romae: in Typographia Medicea, 1592
- Mohammed al-Idrisi: De geographia vniuersali. Hortulus cultissimus, mire orbis regiones, prouincias, insulas, vrbes, earumque dimensiones & orizonta describens. Romae: in Typographia Medicea, 1592
- Missale syriacum. Romae: in Typographia Medicea, 1592
- 'Uthman ibn 'Umar Ibn al-Hajib: Grammatica arabica dicta Kaphia autore filio Alhagiabi = Kāfiya, li-Ĭbn al-Ḥāǧib, Romae: in typographia Medicea, 1592.
- Abu 'Abd Allah Muhammed ben Muhammed ben Dawud al-Sanhagi Ibn Adjurrum: Grammatica arabica in compendium redacta, quae vocatur Giarrumia, auctore Mahmeto filio Dauidis Alsanhagij, Romae : in typographia Medicea, 1592.
- Avicenna: Libri quinque canonis medicinae. Quibus additi sunt in fine libri logicae, physicae et metaphysicae. Arabice nunc primum impressi. Romae: in typographia Medicea, 1593 = Kutub al-qānūn fī ăṭ-ṭibb, maʿa baʿḍ taʾlīfihi wa-huwa ʿilm al-manṭiq wa-ʿilm aṭ-ṭabīʿī wa-ʿilm al-kalām, li-Abū [! sic] ʿAlī Ibn Sīnā (Digitalization of the American University of Beirut: )
- Euklid: Euclidis elementorum geometricorum libri tredecim. Ex traditione doctissimi Nasiridini Tusini. Nunc primum Arabice impressi. Romae: in Typographia Medicea, 1594
- Missale Chaldaicum iuxta ritum Ecclesiae nationis Maronitarum. Romae: in typographia Medicea, 1594
- Gregorio Nuñez Coronel: De vera Christi ecclesia libri decem. Authore fr. Gregorio Nunnio Coronel lusitano ordinis eremitarum s. Augustini professore, et sacrae theologiae doctore. Romae: ex Typographia Medicea : apud Iacobum Lunam, 1594
- Aurelius Augustinus: I tredici libri delle Confessioni. Tradotti di latino in italiano per Giulio Mazzini. In Roma: nella Typografia medicea, appresso Giacomo Luna, 1595
- Breuis orthodoxae fidei professio, quae ex praescripto Sanctae Sedis Apostolicae ab Orientalibus ad sacrosanctae Romanae Ecclesiae vnitatem venientibus facienda proponitur. Iussu sanctissimi domini nostri Clementis VIII. Excussum Romae: in Typographia Medicea, 1595
- Giovanni Battista Eliano: Sacrosanctae Romanae Ecclesiae unitatem venientibus facienda proponitur... Romae: In Typographia Medicea, 1595
- Georgius Amira: Grammatica Syriaca, siue Chaldaica, Georgij Michaelis Amirae Edeniensis e Libano philosophi ac theologi collegij Maronitarum alumni, in septem libros diuisa. Romae: in Typographia linguarum externarum: apud Iacobum Lunam, 1596
- Liber ministri missae iuxta ritum Ecclesia nationis Maronitarum. Romae: ex typographia Linguarum externarum, apud Iacobum Lunam, 1596
- Gregorio Nuñez Coronel: De optimo reipublicae statu libri sex, in duos tomos diuisi. Quibus accessit Apologeticus liber de apostolicis traditionibus. Romae: ex Typographia Externarum Linguarum: apud Iacobum Lunam, 1597
- Gaspare Viviano (Bischof von Sitia und Gerapetra): Constitutiones et decreta ecclesiae Anagninae, edita & promulgata in synodo dioecesana anno MDXCVI. Romae: ex Typographia externarum linguarum apud Jacobum Lunam, 1597
- Caeremoniale episcoporum iussu Clementis VIII pont. max. nouissime reformatum omnibus ecclesijs praecipue autem metropolitanis cathedralibus & collegiatis perutile ac necessarium. Romae: ex Typographia Linguarum Externarum, 1600 mense Octobris.
- 'Abd al-Wahhab ibn Ibrahim al-Zanjani: Liber tasriphi, et est liber conjugationis. Compositio est Senis Alemami. Traditur in eo compendiosa notitia coniugationum verbi Arabici ... Addita est duplex versio Latina... Romae: Ex Typographia Medicaea linguarum externarum, 1610
- Sacrosancta quatuor IesuChristi D. N. Evangelia Arabice scripta, Latine reddita, figurisque ornata. Romae: Ex Typographia Medicea, 1619
