= Girolamo Dandini =

Girolamo Dandini may refer to:

- Girolamo Dandini (cardinal)
- Girolamo Dandini (Jesuit)
