= Civilité =

Typeface invented in 1557 by the French engraver Robert Granjon

Caractères de civilité
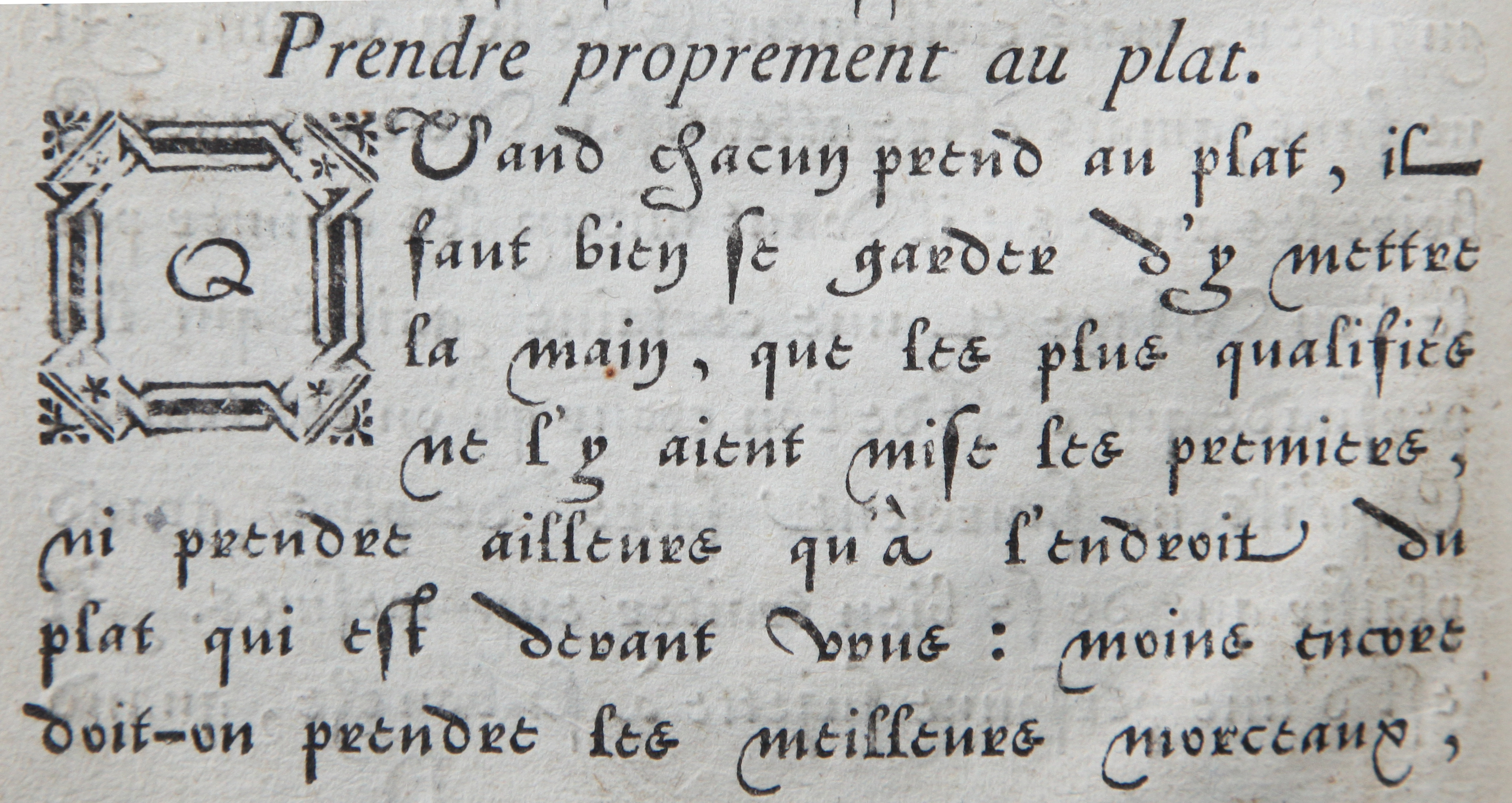
- Category: Cursive
- Designer: Robert Granjon
- Date created: 1557
- See all characters

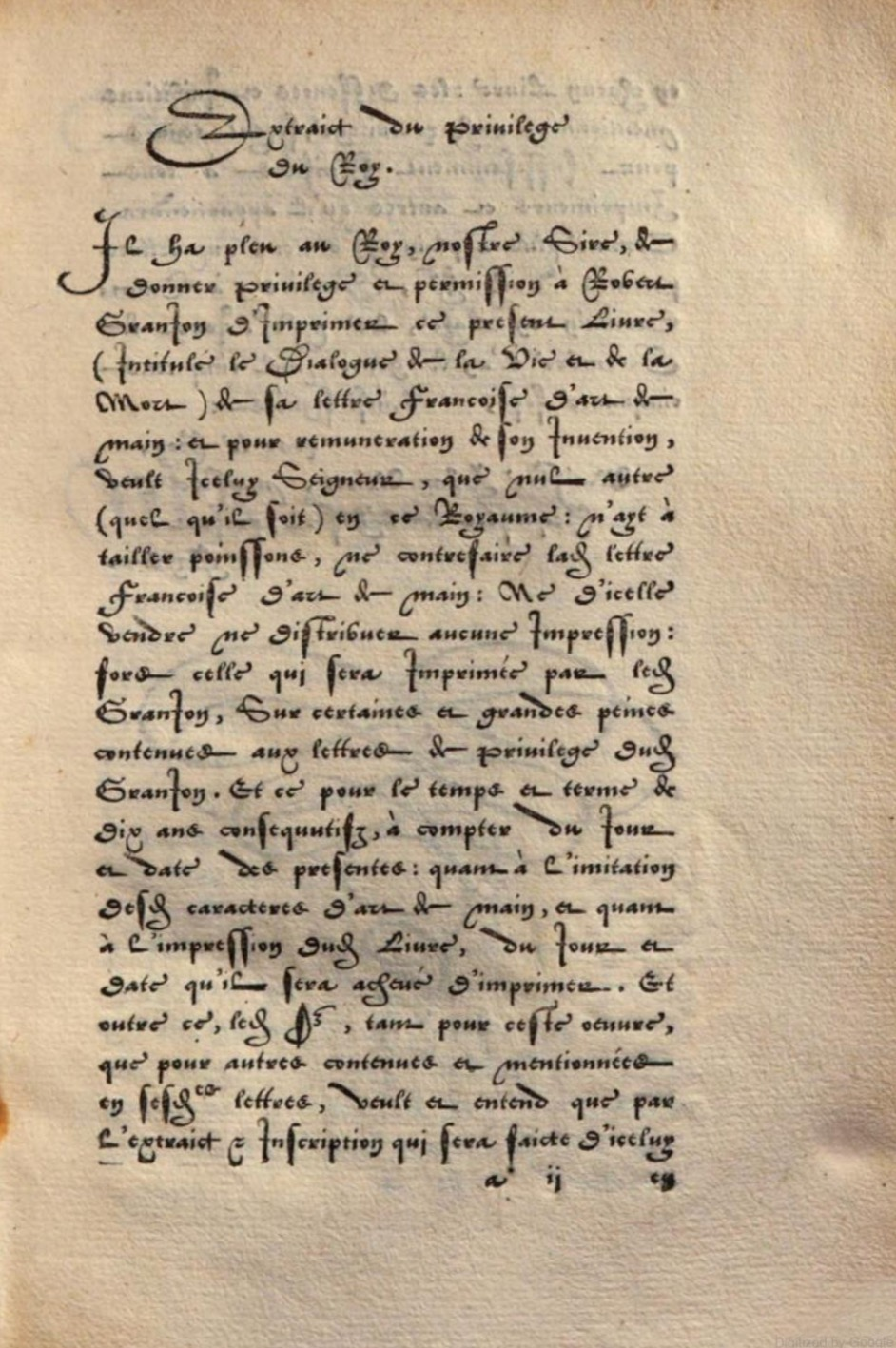
Civilité type in Dialogue de la vie et de la mort, printed and published by Granjon

Civilité type (French: Caractères de civilité) is a typeface introduced in 1557 by the French punchcutter Robert Granjon. These characters imitate French cursiva letters of the Renaissance, specifically a formal style of secretary hand.

== History ==
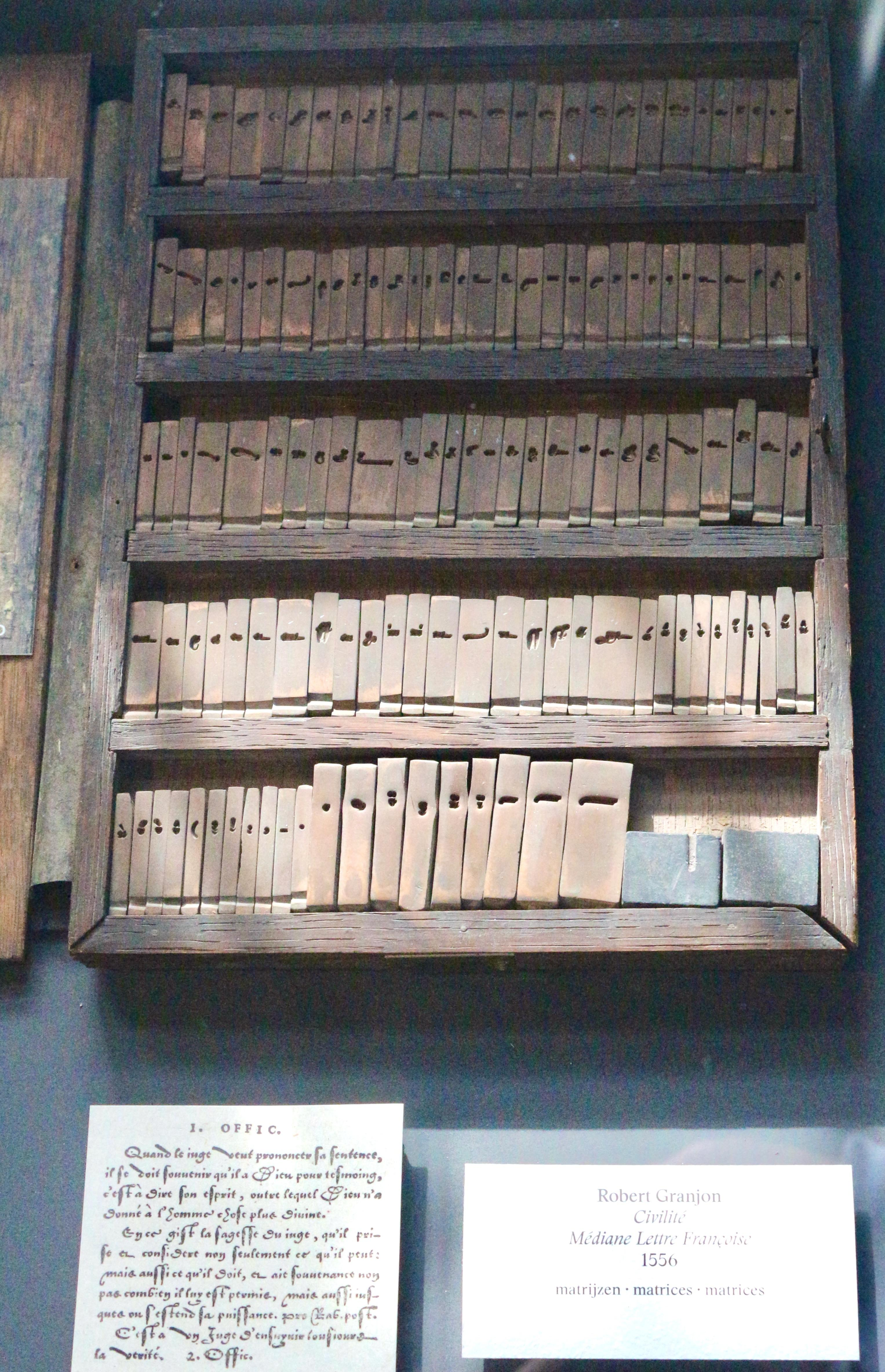
Civilité matrices by Robert Granjon at the Plantin-Moretus Museum

The first book in the new type was Dialogue de la vie et de la mort, a French version of Innocenzo Ringhieri's dialogue, in the dedication of which Granjon explains his purpose in cutting the new design. He calls the typeface "lettres françaises" and suggests that France like other nations should have a type based on the national hand; his model was contemporary handwriting. The popular name for the type came from the titles of two early books in which it was used: Erasmus's La Civilité pueril, Jean Bellère, Antwerp, 1559, and La Civile honesteté pour les enfans, R. Breton, Paris, 1560. "Civilité" meant "good manners" and it was thought an advantage that children should learn to read from a book printed in a type resembling current handwriting. Between 1557 and 1562 Granjon printed some 20 books in this type. Two other Paris printers had typefaces made that were very similar and Granjon himself supplied his version to Guillaume Silvius and to Christophe Plantin at Antwerp. Philippe Danfrie was another early creator of civilité types.

They were mostly employed to print books in Flanders, Holland, England, and France. In the latter, they were used until the second half of the 19th century to print children's lesson-books teaching civility and manners from which the type got its name. Civilité type did not win great popularity in France although used occasionally at all periods. Another version of civilité was used in one book printed in 1597 by Claude Micard, and two others in two books printed by Jean de Tournes in 1581 and 1598. In the mid 19th century Louis Perrin of Lyons printed J. Soulary's Sonnets humouristiques in civilité. Granjon's experiment cannot be said to have been a success: one of the grave disadvantages was that many ligatures were required and some letters had more than one variant.

== Sources ==
- Rémi Jimenes, Les Caractères de civilité. Typographie et calligraphie sous l'Ancien Régime, Gap, Atelier Perrousseaux, 2011.
- Harry Carter & Hendrik Vervliet, Civilité types, Oxford, University Press, 1966.
