= Girolamo Dandini (Jesuit) =

Girolamo Dandini (Latin: Hieronymus Dandinus; 26 May 1554 – 29 November 1634) was an Italian Jesuit and academic.

== Life ==
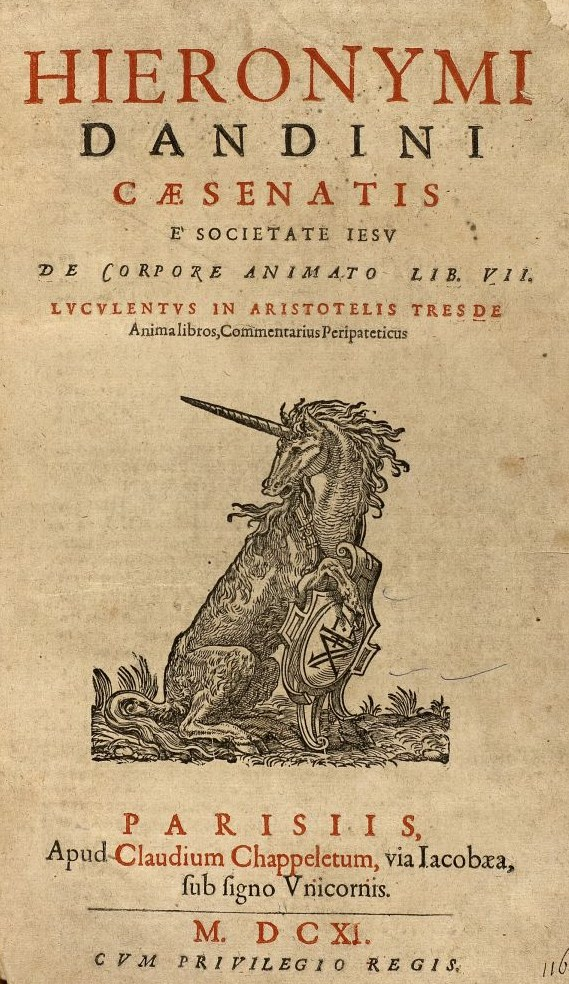
Title page from De corpore animato (1611)

He was born in Cesena. With Juan Maldonado he was the first Jesuit professor in Paris, at the Collège de Clermont; there he taught François de Sales. Later he was professor of theology at Perugia.

He was sent in 1596 by Pope Clement VIII as nuncio to Lebanon, to preside at a general Maronite council, for the purpose of introducing certain liturgical reforms. It was held at the Qannubin Monastery. On the way Dandini visited Cyprus; he was accompanied by Fabio Bruno, who had been on an earlier mission in 1580 with Giovanni Battista Eliano.

Dandini died in Forlì.

== Works ==
His De corpore animato was one of the last scholastic analyses of the intelligible species concept in Aristotle.

He was author of an Ethica sacra: hoc est de virtutibus, et vitiis libri quinquaginta, published in 1651.

In 1656 his account of his mission in Lebanon was published as Missione apostolica al patriarca, e maroniti del Monte Libano. It was translated into French by Richard Simon as Voyage au Mont Liban (1675).

== Sources ==
- Frazee, Charles A. (2006) [1983]. Catholics and Sultans: The Church and the Ottoman Empire 1453-1923. Cambridge: Cambridge University Press. ISBN 9780521027007.
