= Ferdinand, Grand Duke of Tuscany =

Ferdinand, Grand Duke of Tuscany may refer to:

- Ferdinando I de' Medici, Grand Duke of Tuscany (r. 1587–1609)
- Ferdinando II de' Medici, Grand Duke of Tuscany (r. 1621–1670)
- Ferdinand III, Grand Duke of Tuscany (r. 1790–1801)
- Ferdinand IV, Grand Duke of Tuscany (r. 1859–1860)
