= H. D. L. Vervliet =

Belgian librarian and historian (1923–2020)

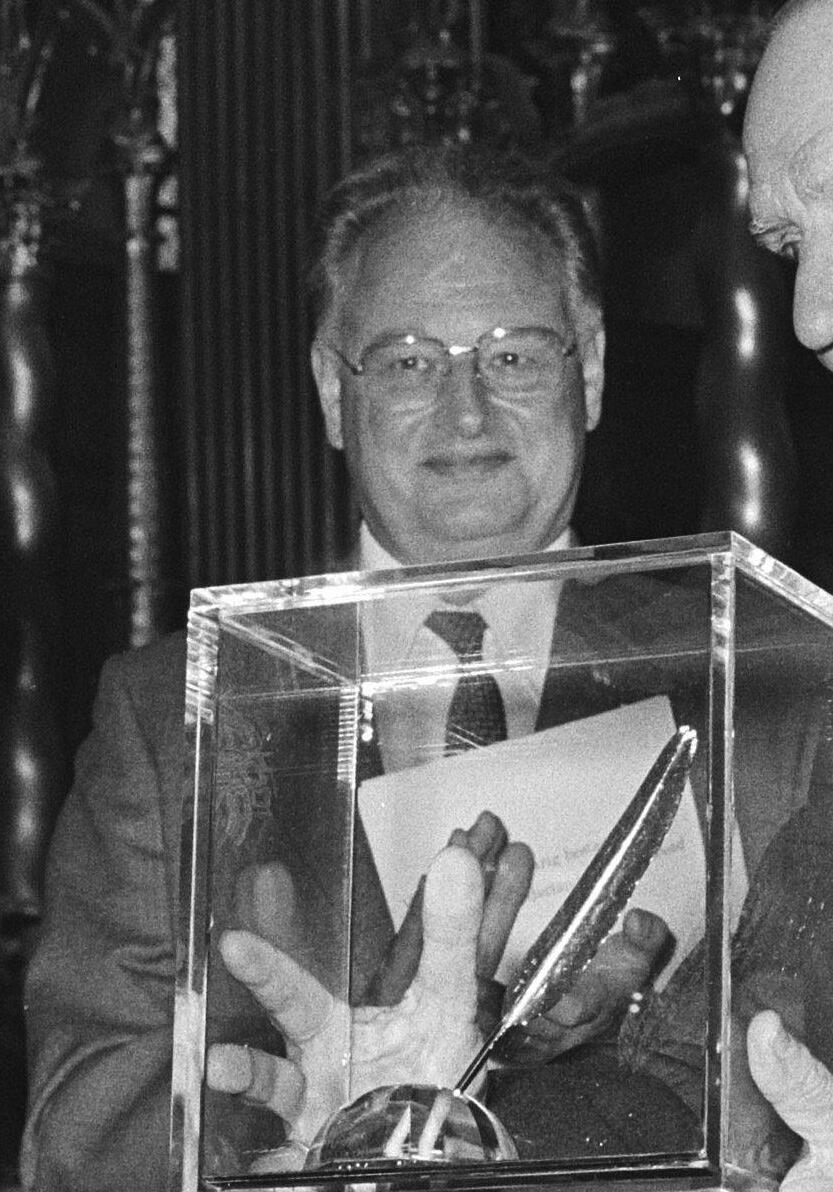
Vervliet in 1980

Hendrik Désiré Louis 'Dis' Vervliet (Antwerp, 31 December 1923 – August 2020) was a Belgian librarian and historian of books and printing.

== Life ==
Vervliet was born into a working-class family and received a doctorate in classical philology in 1955. In his career, Vervliet worked as deputy director of the Museum Plantin-Moretus, professor and librarian of the University of Antwerp and as professor of book and library history of the University of Amsterdam. In 1968 he became a member of the Royal Flemish Academy of Belgium for Science and the Arts in the humanities class. His wife was Irma Regemortels (1928-2006), also a librarian.

== Work ==
In his writing on the history of books, Vervliet was particularly known for his work on printing in the sixteenth century in France, Belgium and the Netherlands, and the work of Robert Granjon. In 2013, Ton Croiset van Uchelen wrote that he "is now generally recognised as the authority on the sixteenth-century typefaces of Western Europe."

After retiring, Vervliet published extensively, in his eighties completing publishing two large volumes on printing in the French renaissance. In his nineties he additionally completed a book on Granjon's floral ornaments, and then a book covering Granjon's entire career published at the age of 94. Returning to the topic of civilité types, which he had published on at the start of his career, at the time of his death he had recently published a paper extending his earlier research on the types of Philippe Danfrie and was working on another paper on Granjon's civilité types.

A festschrift was published for Vervliet in 1988.
