= Ferdinando I de' Medici =

Grand Duke of Tuscany from 1587 to 1609

Ferdinando I
- Cardinal of the Holy Roman Church
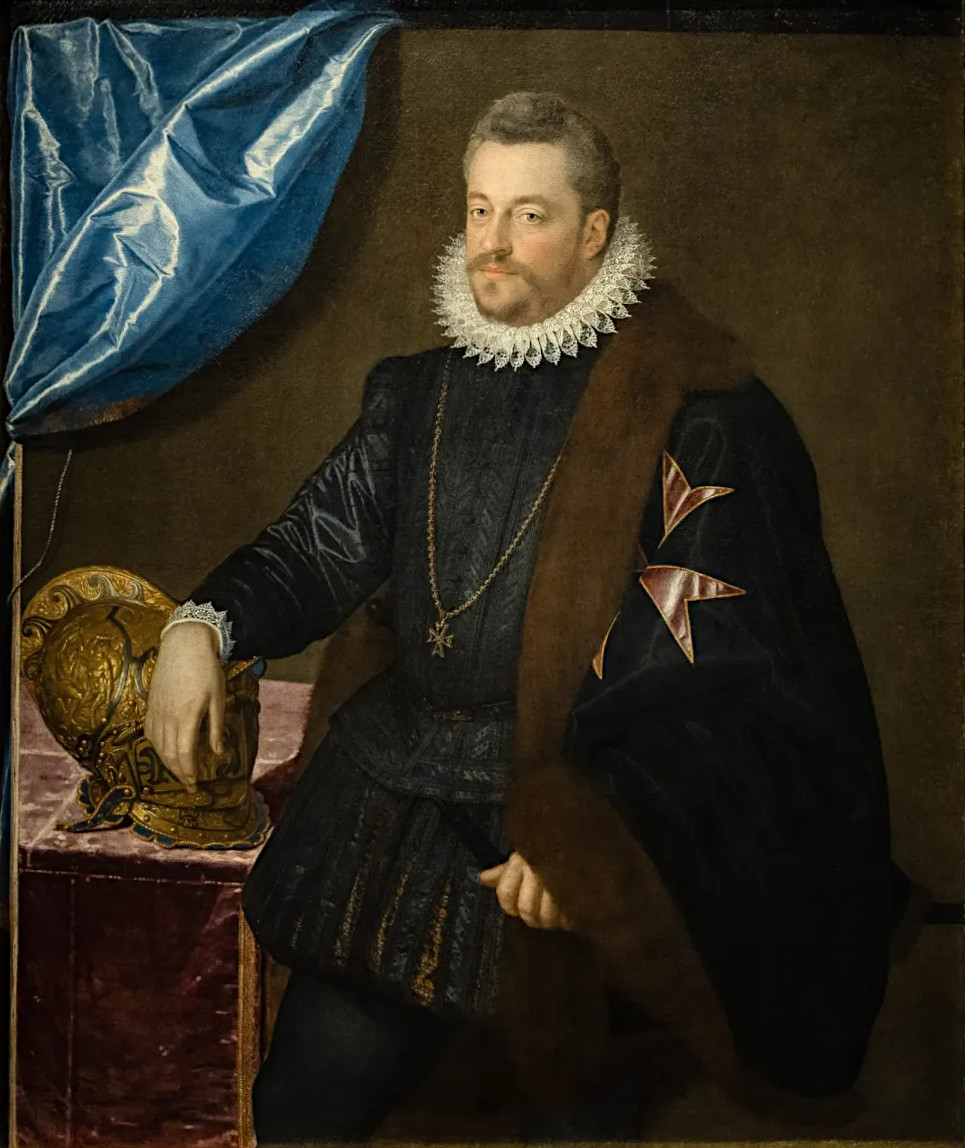
- Ferdinando in 1590

Grand Duke of Tuscany
- Reign: 19 October 1587 – 17 February 1609
- Predecessor: Francesco I
- Successor: Cosimo II
- Born: 30 July 1549; Florence, Duchy of Florence
- Died: 17 February 1609 (aged 59); Florence, Grand Duchy of Tuscany
- Spouse: Christina of Lorraine
- Issue: Cosimo II; Maria Maddalena; Caterina, Duchess of Mantua; Carlo, Bishop of Ostia; Claudia, Archduchess of Austria
Names
- Ferdinando de' Medici
- House: Medici
- Father: Cosimo I de' Medici, Grand Duke of Tuscany
- Mother: Eleanor of Toledo

Ferdinando I de' Medici, Grand Duke of Tuscany (30 July 1549 – 17 February 1609) was Grand Duke of Tuscany from 1587 to 1609, having succeeded his older brother Francesco I. He expanded the culture of Tuscany, which included presenting the opera Euridice by Jacopo Peri. Ferdinando supported Henry IV of France following the assassination of Henry III of France and provided him with financial support. He expanded the Naviglio canal and started an irrigation project in the Val di Chiana. Ferdinando died on 17 February 1609.

== Early life ==
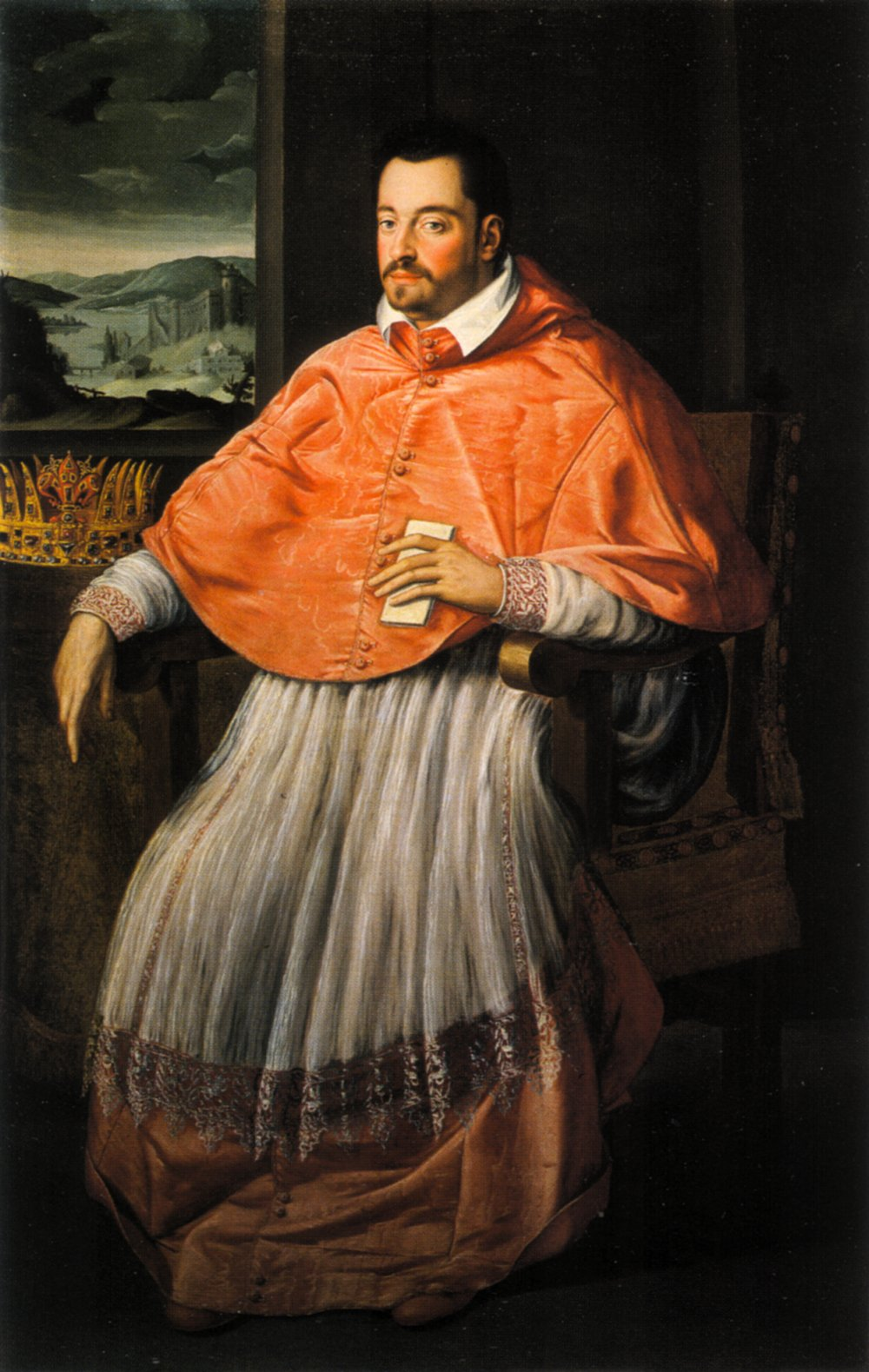
Ferdinando I de' Medici as Cardinal (1562 to 1589).

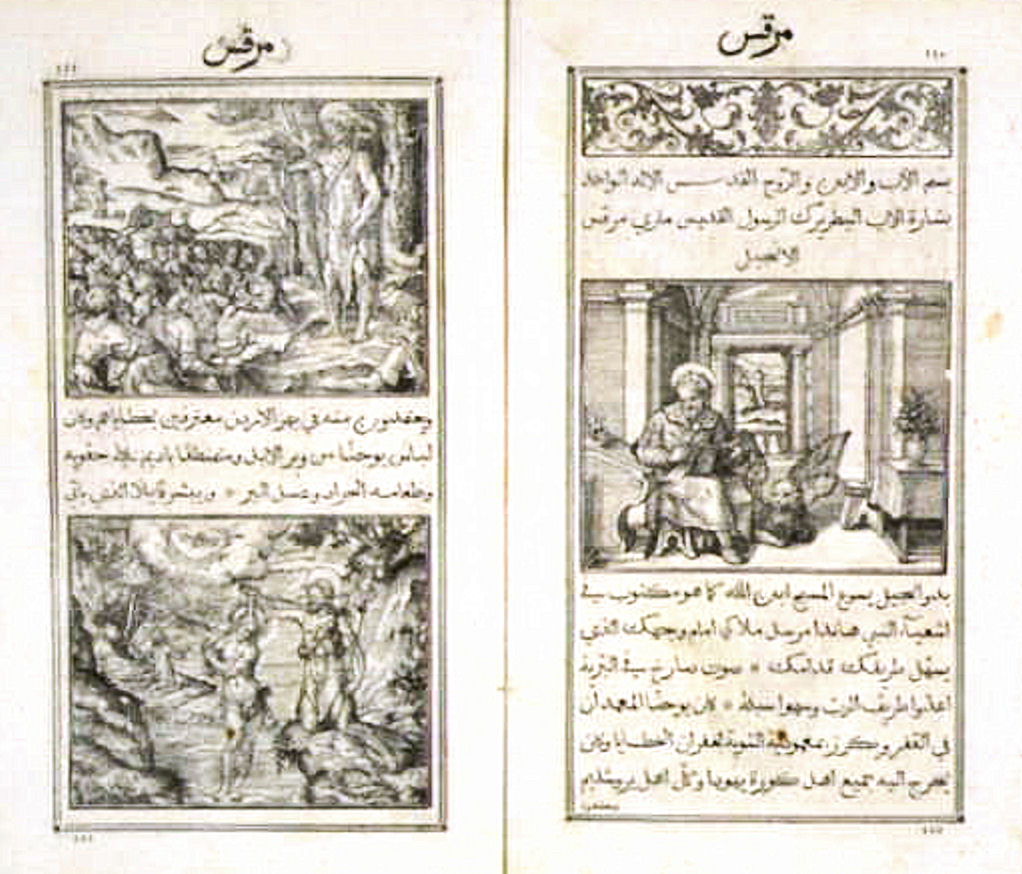
Evangelium Sanctum Domini Nostri Jesu Christi in Arabic, 1590, with Arabic types of Robert Granjon, Typographia Medicea, Rome.

Ferdinando was the fifth son (the third surviving at the time of his birth) of Cosimo I de' Medici, Grand Duke of Tuscany, and Eleanor of Toledo, the daughter of Pedro Álvarez de Toledo, Marquis of Villafranca, the Spanish viceroy of the Kingdom of Naples.

He was made a Cardinal in 1562 at the age of 13, but was never ordained into the priesthood. At Rome, he proved an able administrator. He founded the Villa Medici in Rome. He acquired the large collection of antiquities established by Andrea della Valle in 1584, as well as other works of art like the Medici lions. These were subsequently divided among the various Medici estates.

== Grand Duke ==
When his brother Francesco I de' Medici, Grand Duke of Tuscany, died in 1587, Ferdinando succeeded as grand duke at the age of 38.

In many ways, Ferdinando was the opposite of his brother who preceded him. Approachable and generous, he set out to rule mildly. He re-established the justice system and was genuinely concerned about the welfare of his subjects. During his reign, Tuscany revived and regained the independence his brother had given up.

Ferdinando fostered commerce and gained great wealth through the Medici banks, which were established in all the major cities of Europe. He introduced policies supporting religious freedom, transforming Livorno into a safe haven for Spanish Jews and other marginalized groups fleeing persecution. He established the Medici Oriental Press (Typographia Medicea), which published numerous books in the Arabic script.

Ferdinando expanded the harbor built by Cosimo I and rerouted a portion of the Arno River into the Naviglio canal, improving commercial links between Florence and Pisa. He fostered an irrigation project in the Val di Chiana, which allowed the flatlands around Pisa and Fucecchio and in the Val di Nievole to be cultivated.

Florence’s most significant cultural accomplishment under Ferdinando’s rule was the emergence of opera in Europe. In 1600, to mark the marriage of Ferdinando’s niece Marie de’ Medici to King Henry IV of France, his court organized a grand staging of Euridice by Jacopo Peri, one of the first important operas.

== Marriage ==
For the first two years of his reign, he retained position as cardinal, but Ferdinando gave it up in order to marry Christina of Lorraine in 1589. The couple had a large reception at the Villa di Poggio a Caiano. Christina's dowry was fairly large; it included 600,000 crowns in cash as well as jewellery with a value of 50,000 crowns. Also, the rights of the Duchy of Urbino were transferred to Christina after the death of Queen Catherine de' Medici of France and thus assumed by future Medici rulers.

== Foreign policy ==
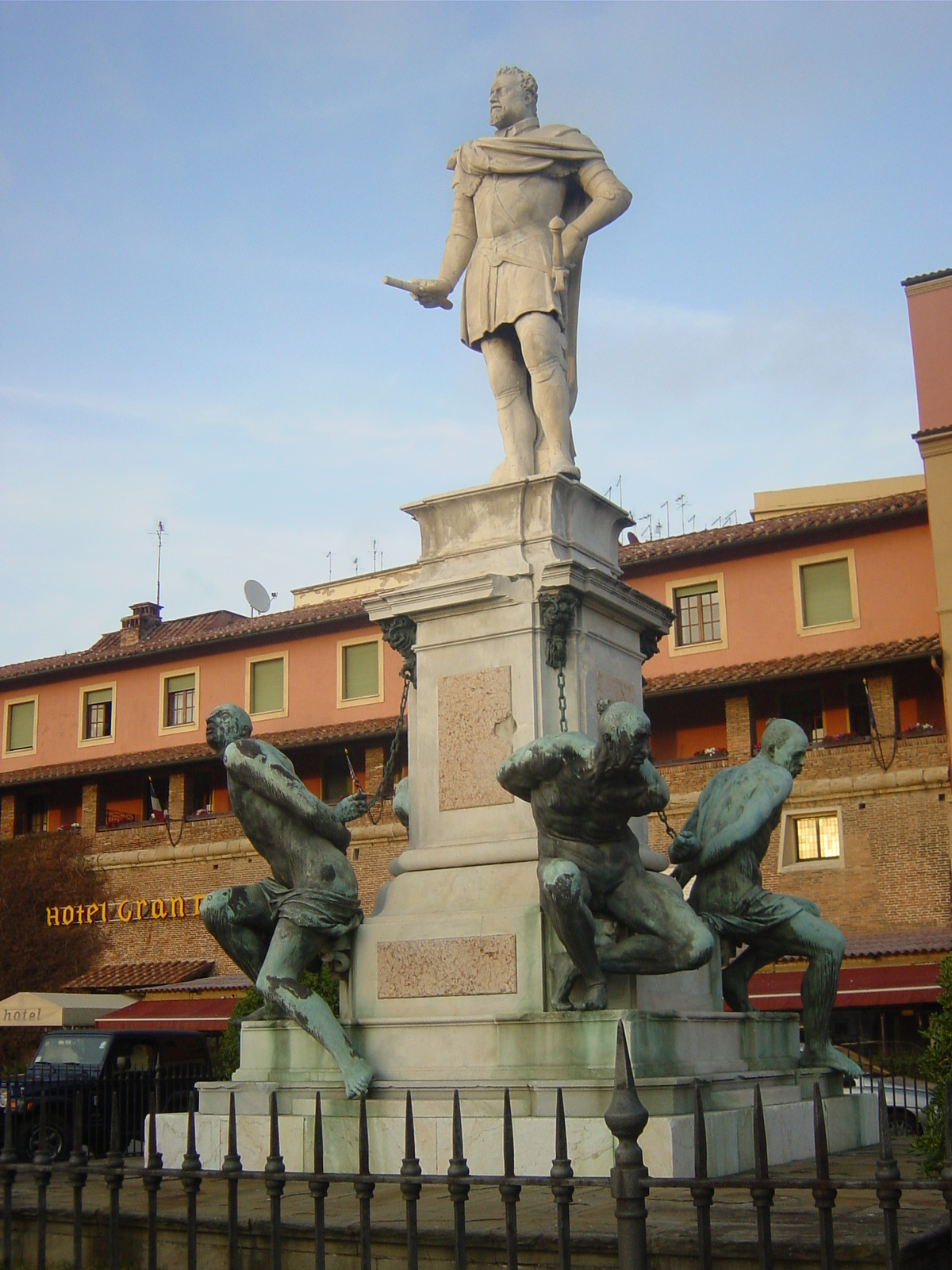
Pietro Tacca's Monumento dei Quattro Mori (Monument of the Four Moors) in Leghorn, showing Ferdinando holding the baton of a field marshal standing victorious above chained Moorish captives. (1623)

Ferdinando's foreign policy attempted to free Tuscany from Spanish domination. After the assassination of Henry III of France in 1589, he supported Henry IV of France in his struggles against the Catholic League. Ferdinando provided Henry with financial support and urged him to embrace Catholicism, which Henry ultimately did. Ferdinando also leveraged his influence over Pope Clement VIII to convince him to acknowledge Henry’s conversion.

Henry showed no appreciation for these favours, and Ferdinando let the relationship cool, maintaining his cherished independence. He supported Philip III of Spain in his campaign in Algeria and Rudolf II, Holy Roman Emperor in his against the Ottoman Empire. For these undertakings, he found it necessary to raise taxes on his subjects. He finally obtained the formal investiture of Siena, which his father had conquered. Ferdinando sought to reconquer Cyprus for the Christians and had similar designs on the Holy Land, while also seeking commercial ties with Aleppo. He sent Ottoman convert Michel Angelo Corai to Ali Janbulad as an ambassador to fund rebellion in Ottoman Syria.

Ferdinando reinforced the Tuscan fleet, which achieved victories over Barbary pirates in 1607 and defeated a larger Turkish fleet the next year.

Ferdinando also dreamed of a small African empire, and then considered the possibility of a colony in Brazil. A few months before his death, Ferdinando organised an expedition in 1608, under the command of Captain Robert Thornton to northern Brazil and the Amazon River in order to create a colony.

== Issue ==
Ferdinando and Christina had:

- Cosimo II (1590–1621), who succeeded as Grand Duke of Tuscany; he married Maria Maddalena of Austria and had issue
- Eleonora (1591–1617), died unmarried
- Caterina (1593–1629), married Ferdinando Gonzaga, Duke of Mantua, later Governor of Siena
- Francesco (1594–1614), died unmarried
- Carlo (1595–1666), died unmarried
- Filippino (1598–1602), died unmarried
- Lorenzo (1599–1648), died unmarried
- Maria Maddalena (1600–1633), died unmarried
- Claudia (1604–1648), married first to Federico della Rovere, then to Leopold V, Archduke of Austria

== Sources ==
- Biagioli, Beatrice; Stumpo, Elisabetta, eds. (2015). Lettere alla figlia Caterina de' Medici Gonzaga duchessa di Mantova (1617-1629) (in Italian). Firenze University Press. ISBN 9788866557319.
- Butters, Suzanne B. (2002). "Ferdinando de' Medici and the Art of the Possible". The Medici, Michelangelo, & the Art of Late Renaissance Florence. Yale University Press. ISBN 9780300094954.
- Cavallo, Sandra; Evangelisti, Silvia, eds. (2017). Domestic Institutional Interiors in Early Modern Europe. Taylor & Francis. ISBN 9781351569316.
- Federici, Federico M. (2014). "A Servant of Two Masters: The Translator Michel Angelo Corai as a Tuscan Diplomat (1599–1609)". In Federici, Federico M.; Tessicini, Dario (eds.). Translators, Interpreters, and Cultural Negotiators: Mediating and Communicating Power from the Middle Ages to the Modern Era. London: Palgrave Macmillan UK. pp. 81–104. doi:10.1057/9781137400048_6. ISBN 978-1-137-40004-8.
- Flaten, Arne R. (2012). Medals and Plaquettes in the Ulrich Middeldorf Collection at the Indiana University Art Museum: 15th to 20th Centuries. Indiana University Press. ISBN 9780253001160.
- Guarini, Elena Fasano (2004). ""Rome, workshop of all the practices of the world": from the Letters of Cardinal Ferdinando de' Medici to Cosimo I and Francesco I". In Signorotto, Gianvittorio; Visceglia, Maria Antonietta (eds.). Court and Politics in Papal Rome, 1492–1700. Cambridge University Press. pp. 53–77. ISBN 978-0521641463.
- Hibbert, Christopher (1979). "XXI". In Pelican History of Art (ed.). The Rise and Fall of the House of Medici. Penguin Books Ltd. pp. 279–281.
- Hollingsworth, Mary (2025). Catherine de' Medici: The Life and Times of the Serpent Queen. Apollo. ISBN 978-1800244771.
- Ludwig, F. (1906). The history of the popes from the close of the Middle Ages. K. Paul, Trench, Truebner & Co. p. 312.
- Mayer, Thomas F. (2012). The Trial of Galileo, 1612-1633. University of Toronto Press. ISBN 9781442605213.
- Merewether, Charles (2024). From Fascination to Folly: A Troubled History of Collecting since the 1600s. Springer. ISBN 9789819790807.
- Pecknold, Sara (2021). "The Court Chapels of the Tyrolean Line: From Archduke Ferdinand II to Archduke Ferdinand Charles". In Weaver, Andrew H. (ed.). A Companion to Music at the Habsburg Courts in the Sixteenth and Seventeenth Centuries. Brill. pp. 220–254. ISBN 978-90-04-43436-3.
- Sanger, Alice E. (2017). Art, Gender and Religious Devotion in Grand Ducal Tuscany. Routledge. ISBN 9781351957014.
- Santus, Cesare (2025). "The Roman Curia and the Eastern Churches, 1500-1800: Diplomacy, Cultural Policy, Mission, and Confessional Control". In Prudlo, Donald S. (ed.). A Companion to the History of the Roman Curia. Brill. pp. 284–301. ISBN 9789004723665.
- Strong, Roy C. (1984). Art and power: Renaissance festivals, 1450-1650. University of California Press. ISBN 9780520054790.
- Pizzorusso, Claudio (2002). "Galileo in the Garden: Observations on the Sculptural Furnishings of Florentine Gardens between the Sixteenth and Seventeenth Centuries". The Medici, Michelangelo, & the Art of Late Renaissance Florence. Yale University Press. ISBN 9780300094954.
- Williams, George L. (1998). Papal Genealogy: The Families and Descendants of the Popes. McFarland & Company, Inc. ISBN 9781476632278.

Regnal titles
Preceded by Francesco I de' Medici	Grand Duke of Tuscany; 1587–1609	Succeeded by Cosimo II de' Medici
