= Giovanni Battista Eliano =

Jesuit priest and scholar (died 1580)

Reverend Giovanni Battista Eliano
- Solmon Romano
- Born: 1530; Rome, Papal States
- Died: 3 March 1589 (aged 58–59); Rome, Papal States
- Occupations: Catholic priest, translator, university teacher, orientalist, diplomat
- Parent(s): Yitzchaq ben Yeḥiel Boemo and Ḥanah Levita

Academic background
- Education: Roman College

Academic work
- Discipline: Hebrew scholar, Ancient Near Eastern Linguist
- Institutions: Roman College

Giovanni Battista Eliano (né Solmon Romano; 1530 – 3 March 1589) was a Jesuit priest and scholar of Oriental languages.

== Life ==
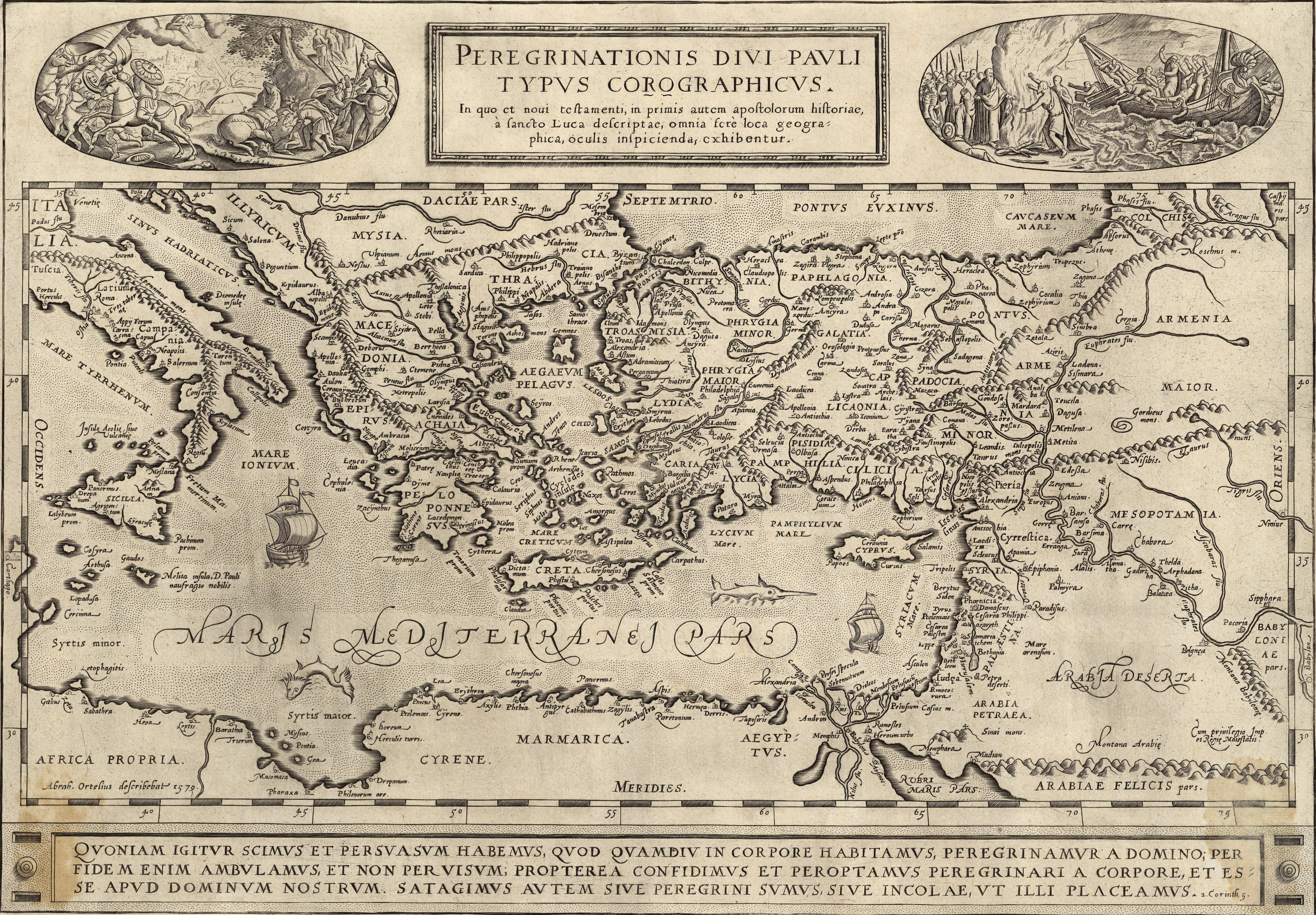
Map of the Eastern Mediterranean, 1579

Giovanni Battista Eliano, sometimes called Giovanni Battista Romano, was a convert to Roman Catholicism from Judaism, and flourished in the second half of the 16th century. Sources variously say that he was a native of Alexandria, was born in Rome in 1530, or was born in Naples in about 1536.

His maternal grandfather was the noted scholar Elias Levita, whence he adopted the surname Eliano. He was formerly known as Solomon Romano. He received instruction from his learned grandfather while in Germany. He then travelled in Italy, and in Venice he tried to bring his brother back into the fold of the synagogue, in which he did not succeed; on the contrary, he became himself a convert to Christianity, and was baptised in 1551. For a long time he was professor of Hebrew and Arabic in Rome.

In 1561 Pope Pius IV sent him to the Patriarch of the Copts, together with Roderich, a member of his Order. He translated Giovanni Bruno's catechism, which was written against the Oriental heretics, into three Semitic languages, and translated into Arabic the Latin decrees of the Council of Trent, for the sake of having them circulated in the East.

He is infamous in the Maronite Church for having done mass burnings of invaluable Maronite manuscripts and books he deemed heretical. Maronite Patriarch Estephan El Douaihy noted that Eliano was not a scholar in Arabic and could not understand many of the works he was condemning. Douaihy also noted that Eliano could not differentiate between Maronite and non-Maronite books.

He died at Rome on 3 March 1589.

== Sources ==
- Casari, Mario (2016). "Raimondi, Giovanni Battista". Dizionario Biografico degli Italiani (in Italian). Vol. 86: Querenghi–Rensi. Rome: Istituto dell'Enciclopedia Italiana. ISBN 978-88-12-00032-6.
- Clines, Robert (2019). A Jewish Jesuit in the Eastern Mediterranean. Cambridge: Cambridge University Press. doi:10.1017/9781108756419.
- Roth, Cecil (2007). "Eliano, Giovanni Battista". Encyclopaedia Judaica. Vol. 6. Thomson Gale. p. 318.
- Zorattini, Cesare Ioly (1993). "Eliano, Giovanni Battista". Dizionario Biografico degli Italiani (in Italian). Vol. 42: Dugoni–Enza. Rome: Istituto dell'Enciclopedia Italiana. ISBN 978-88-12-00032-6.
- "John Eliano". In Encyclopædia Britannica. Retrieved 5 November 2022.
- Girard, Aurélien (1 June 2015), "Giovanni Battista Eliano", Christian-Muslim Relations 1500 - 1900, Brill

Attribution:

- Pick, B. (1880). "Romano, Giovanni Battista". In McClintock, John; Strong, James (eds.). Cyclopædia of Biblical, Theological and Ecclesiastical Literature. Vol. 9.—Rh–St. New York: Harper & Brothers. p. 101.
