= Robert Granjon =

French type designer & printer (c.1513–1590)

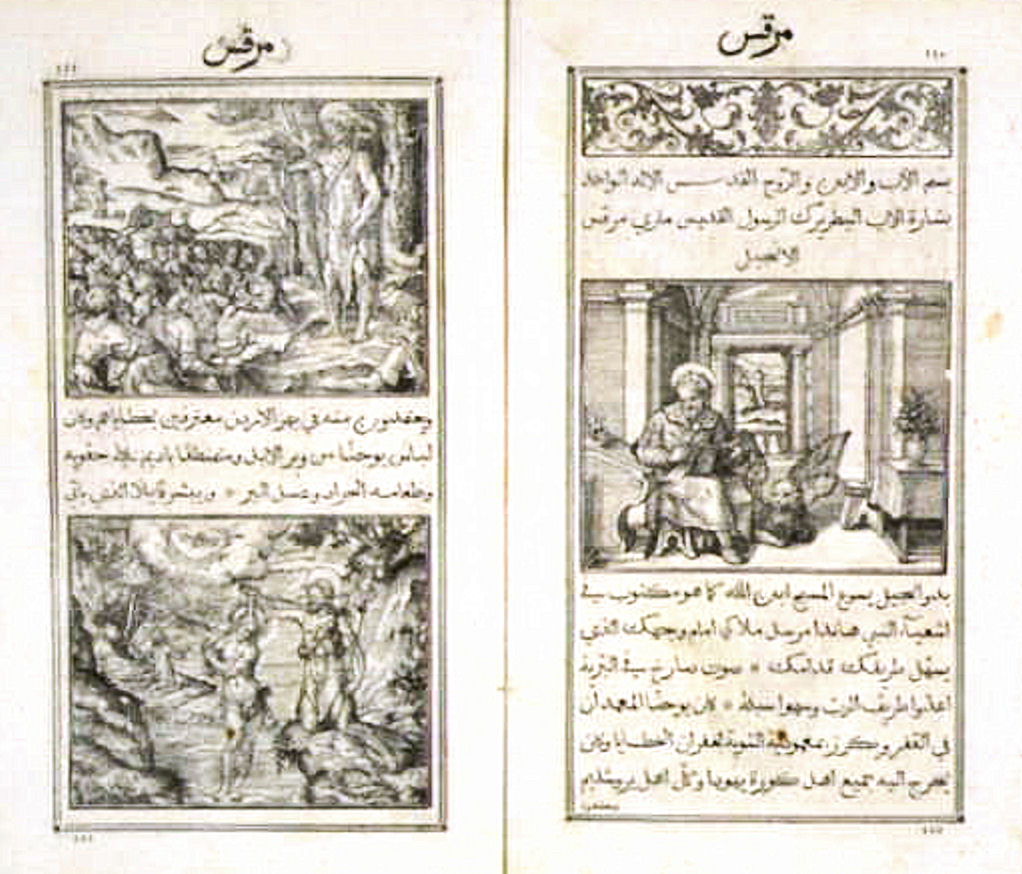
Evangelium Sanctum Domini Nostri Jesu Christi in Arabic, 1590, with Arabic types of Robert Grandjon, Typographia Medicea, Rome.

Robert Granjon (Paris, c. 1513 – Rome, 1590) was a French punchcutter, a designer and creator of metal type, and printer. He worked in Paris, Lyon, Antwerp, and Rome. He is best known for having introduced the typeface style Civilité, for his many italic types and his fleuron designs, although he worked across all genres of typeface and alphabet across his long career.

== Career ==
The son of Parisian bookseller and printer Jean Granjon, he married the daughter of wood engraver Bernard Salomon.

In 1557, he introduced his "lettre françoise" type, now generally called "Civilité". It was based on contemporary French handwriting. The first book he published using it was Dialogue de la vie et de la mort by Ringhieri in 1557. In a preface, he wrote that he hoped it would be a national letter style for the French language comparable to those of the "Hebrews, Greeks [and] Romans". He had received from Henry II an exclusive privilege to use the type for ten years, although it was apparently not enforced, as Philippe Danfrie and Richard Breton quickly brought out an imitation.

Granjon's influential italic types had sloped roman capitals and a greater slope angle than some earlier italics in the Aldine style.

In Paris and Lyons he printed several books of music. Granjon's types were widely distributed across Europe. His Greek types, in the style of Claude Garamond's Grecs du roi types, were also very widely used.

By 1579, he had moved to Rome. There he worked on types for Oriental characters needed by the Catholic missionaries: Armenian (1579), Syriac (1580), Cyrillic (1582), and Arabic (1580-86). He collaborated with Giambattista Raimondi, the scientific director of the Stamperia Medicea Orientale, and Domenico Basa, the technical director of the Stamperia Vaticana, and contributed to the earliest printed editions in certain Oriental languages. He died in 1590 and was buried in the Trinità dei Monti church.

His name continued to be known in the printing trade for the century after his death: in 1667 the Amsterdam merchant Paul le Conte claimed (dubiously, according to John A. Lane) that all his matrices were made by Granjon.

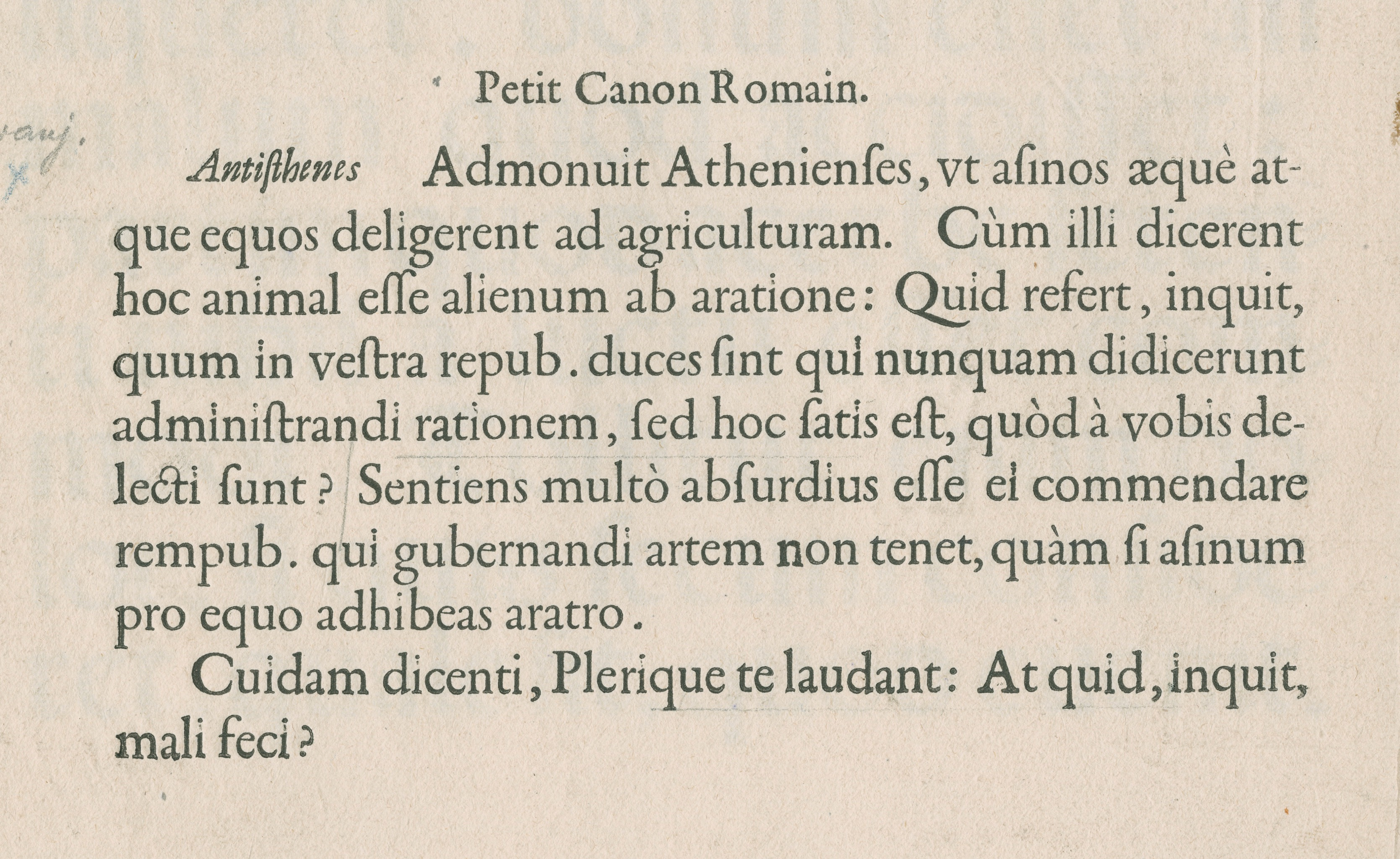
Roman type on Plantin's specimen of c. 1585

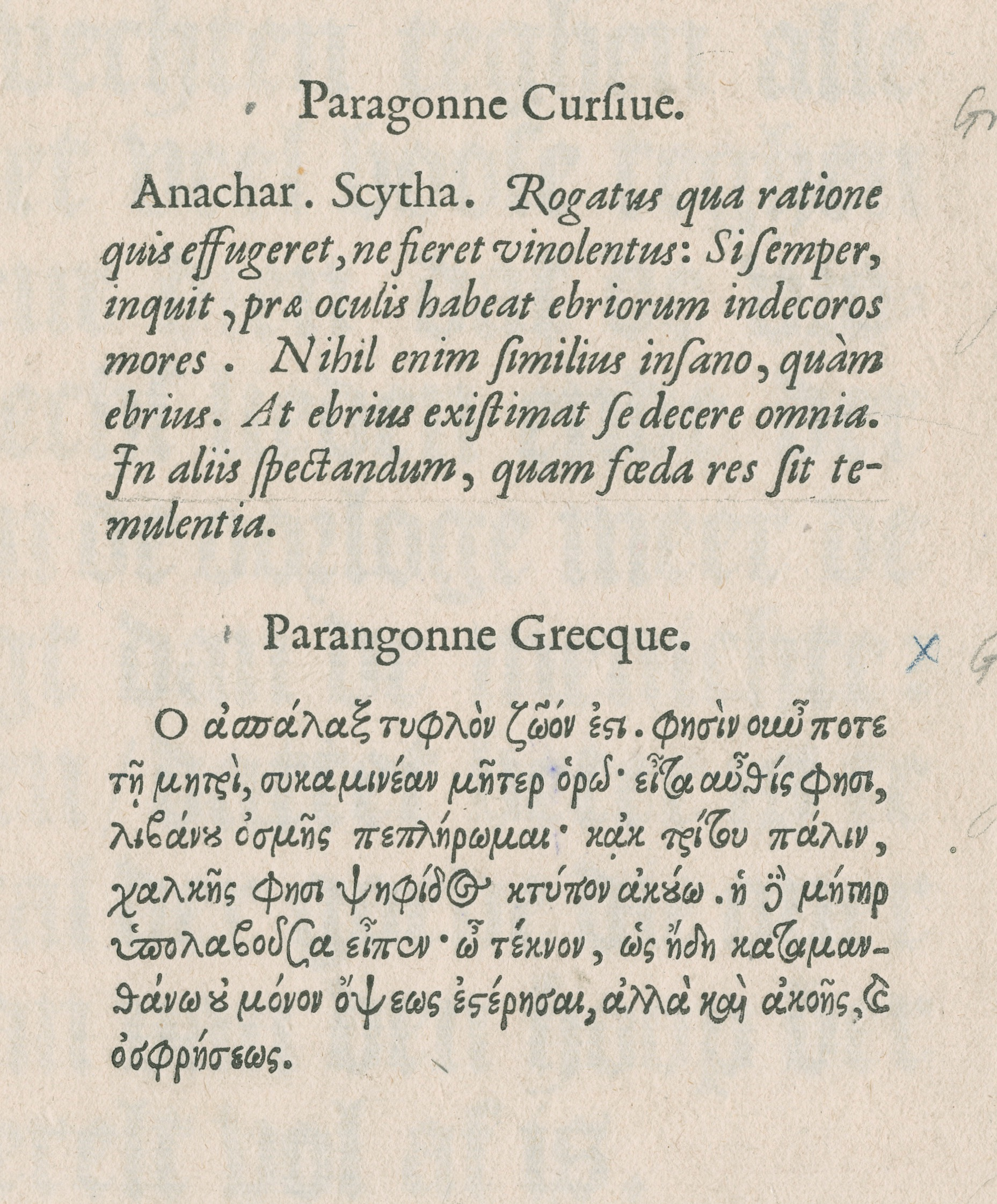
Italic and Greek types

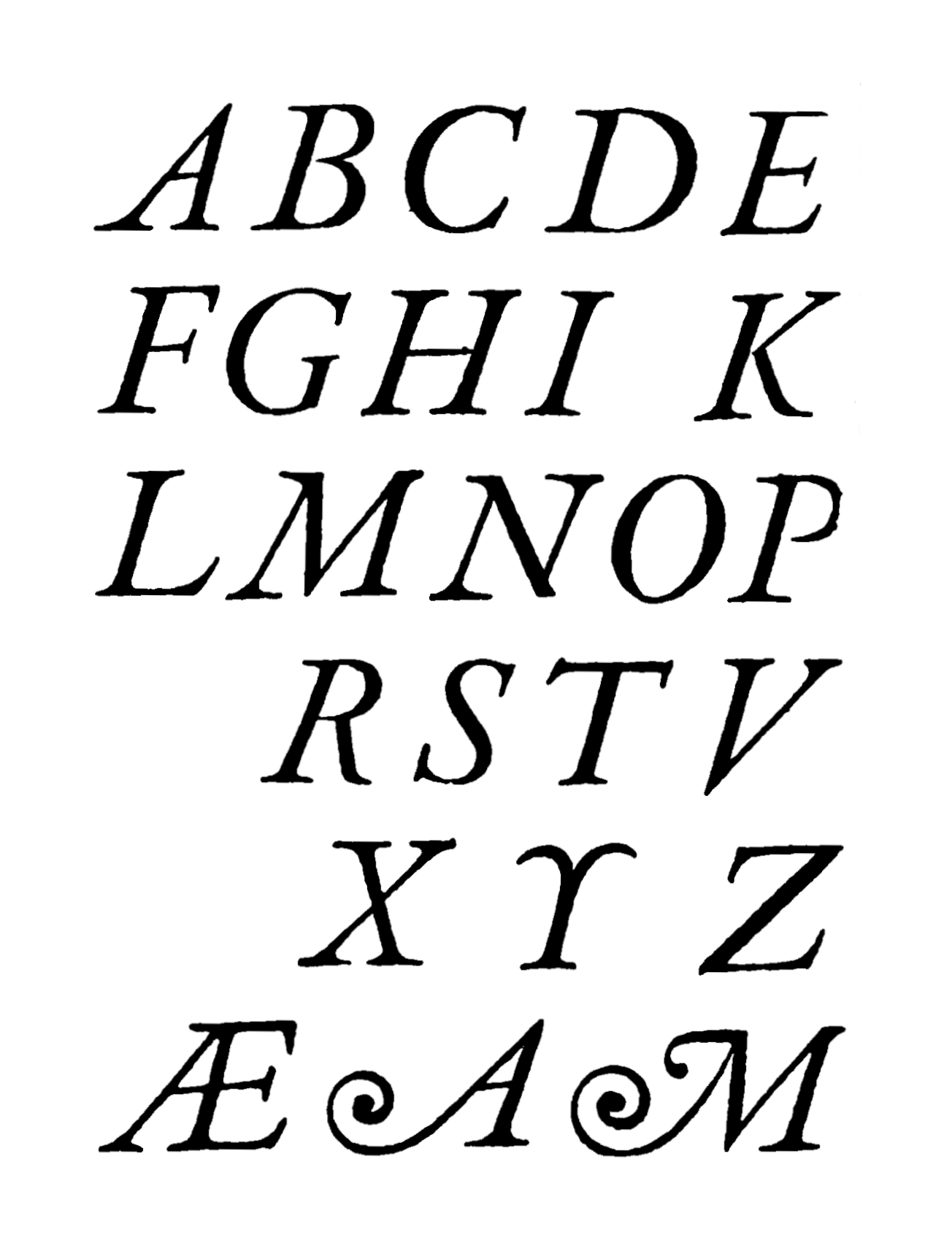
Italic capitals by Granjon with swash alternate characters

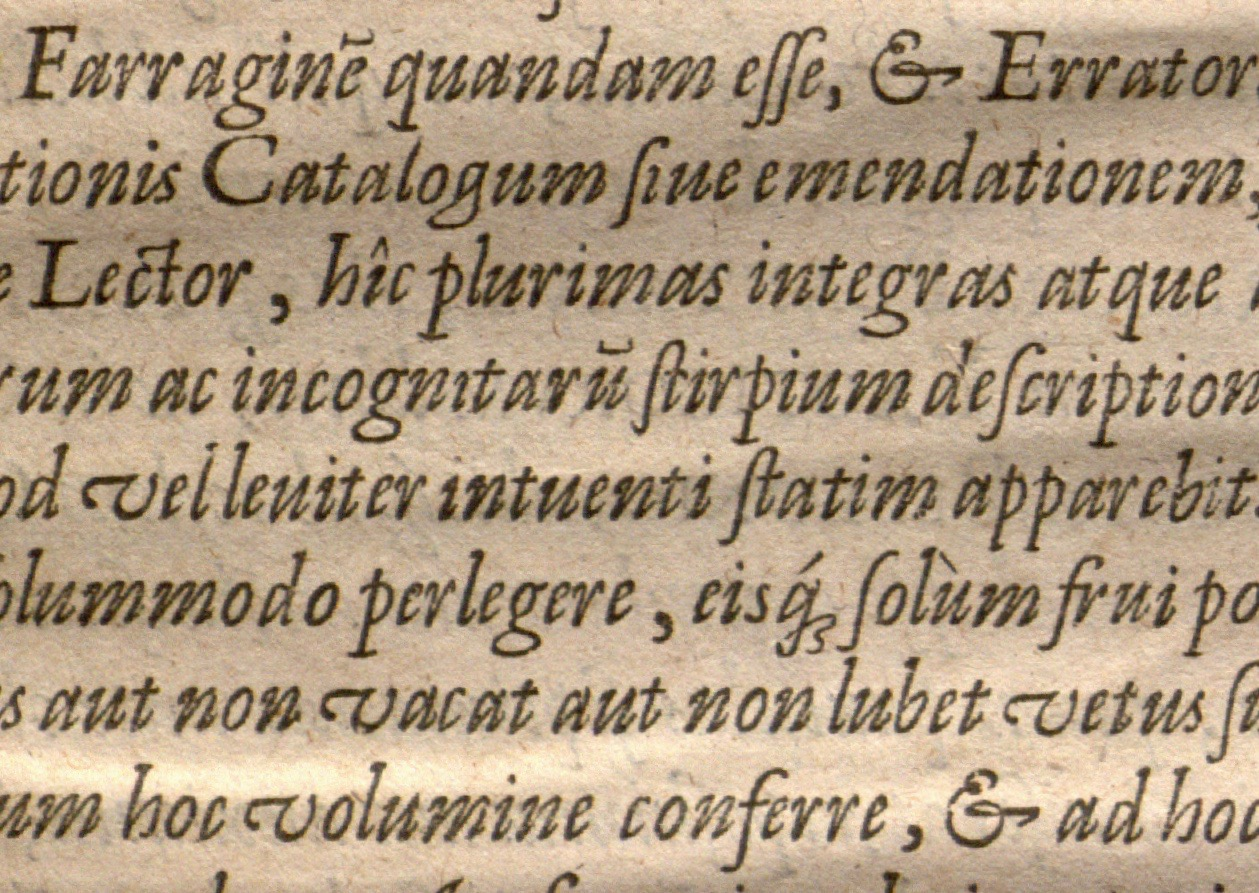
Granjon's Ascendonica italic in a book.

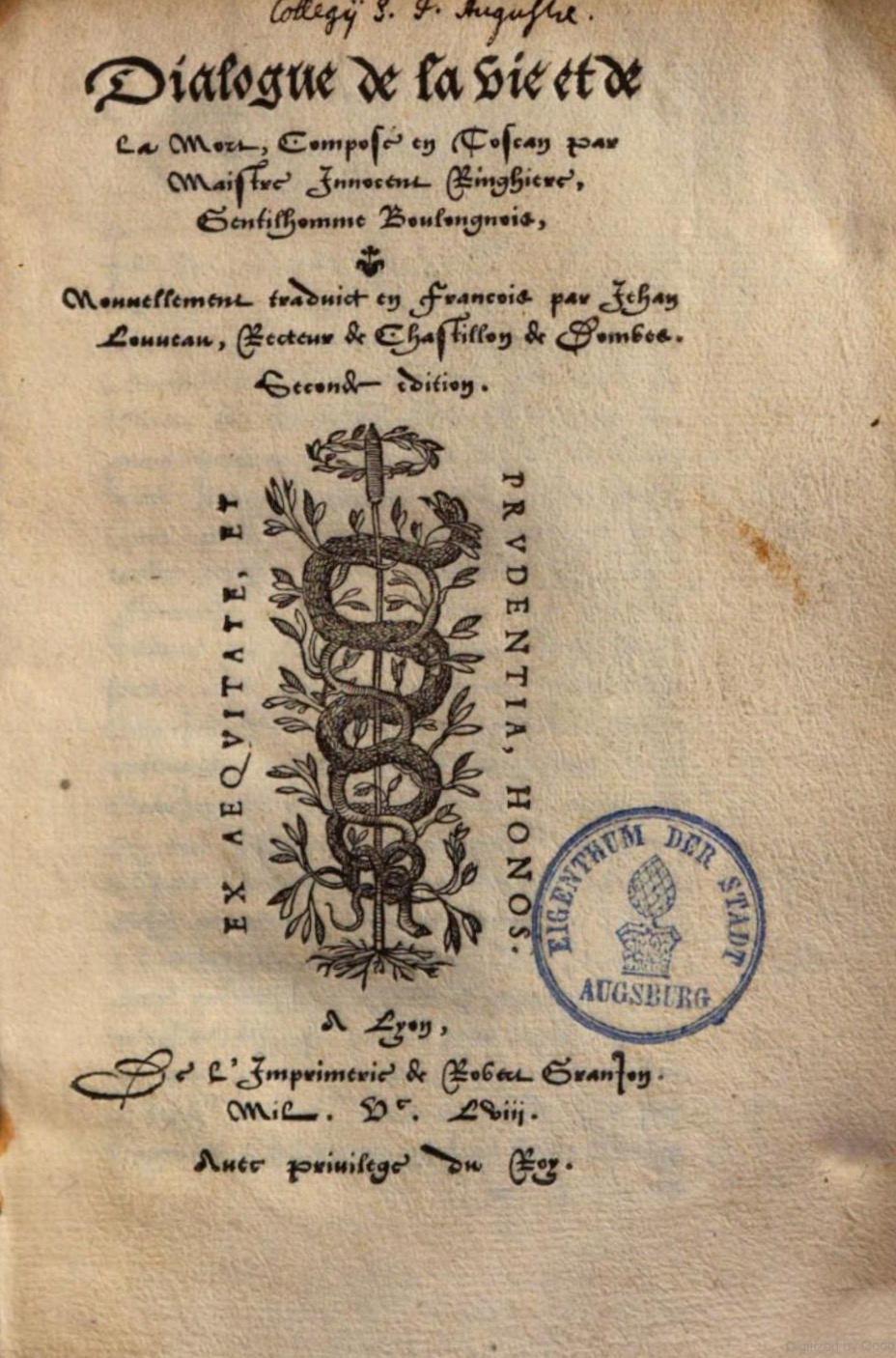
Title page of Dialogue de la vie et de la mort, printed and published by Granjon in his "lettre françoise" (Civilité) type, 1558.

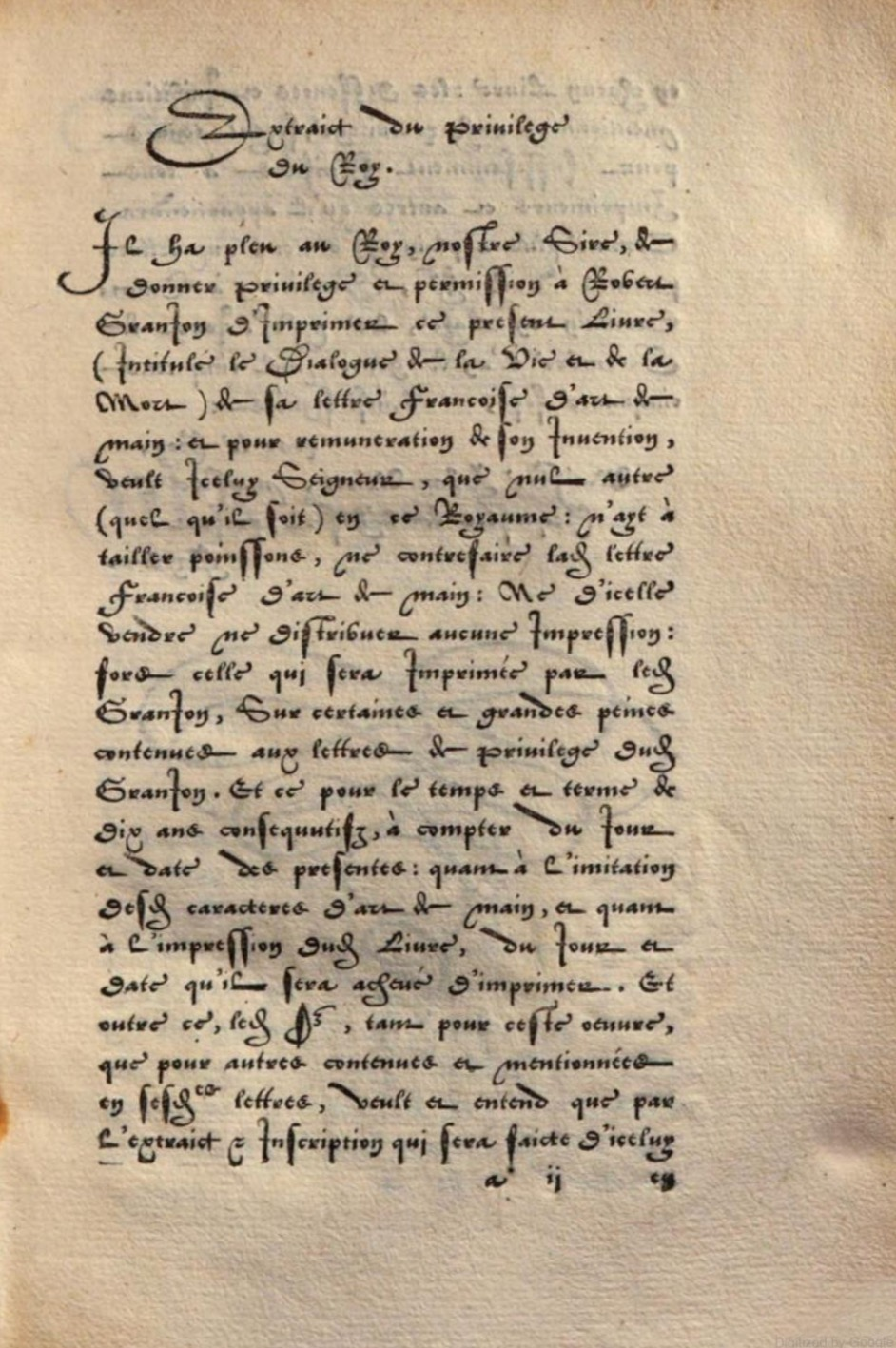
Text page of Dialogue de la vie et de la mort, announcing the royal privilege

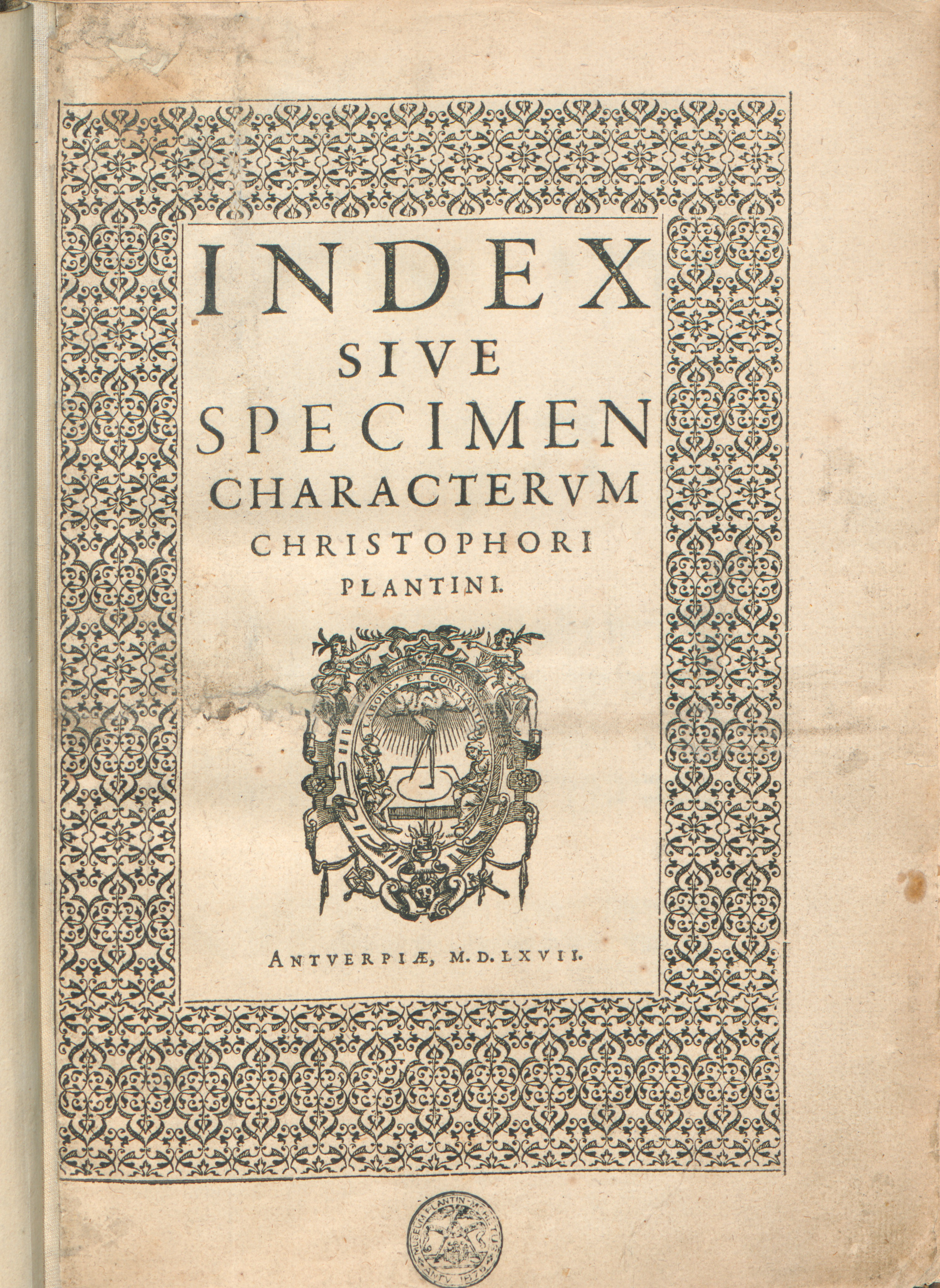
Plantin's type specimen of 1567, using Granjon's fleurons as the border

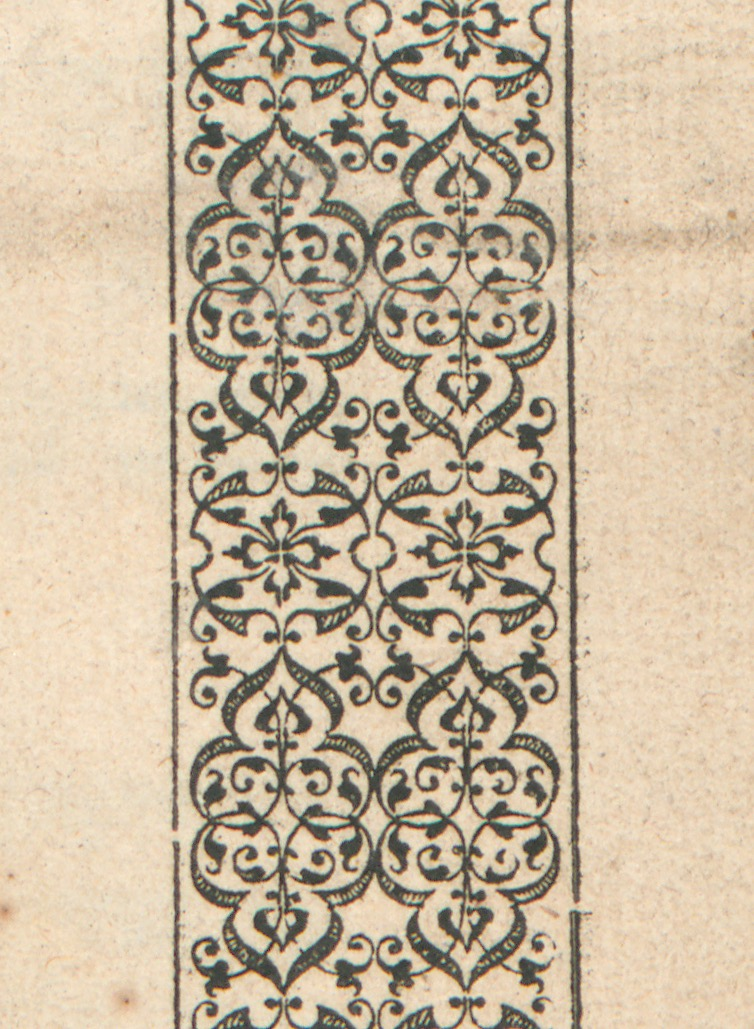
Detail of Granjon's fleuron design

Many of Granjon's punches and matrices are preserved.

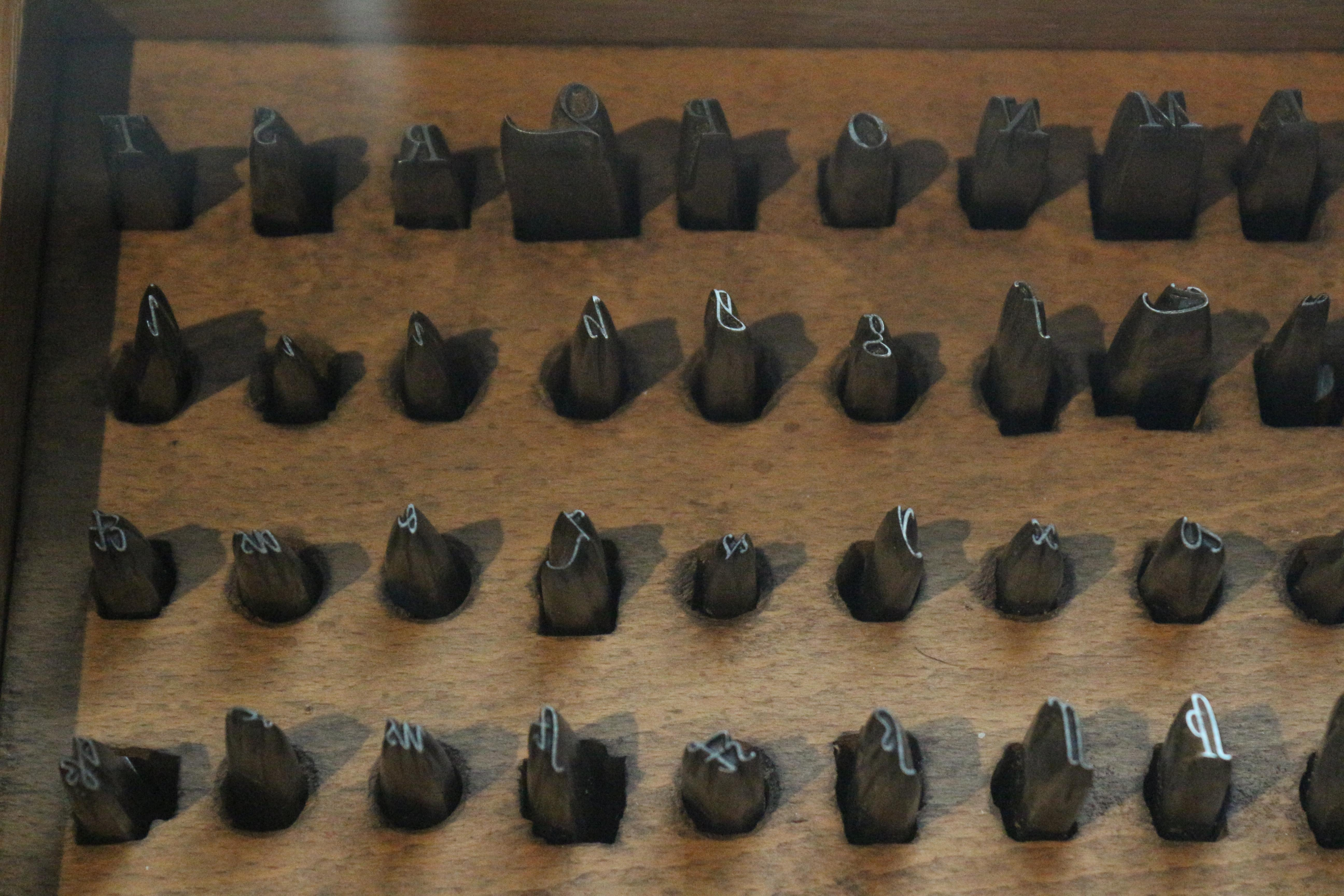
Italic punches in the Plantin-Moretus Museum

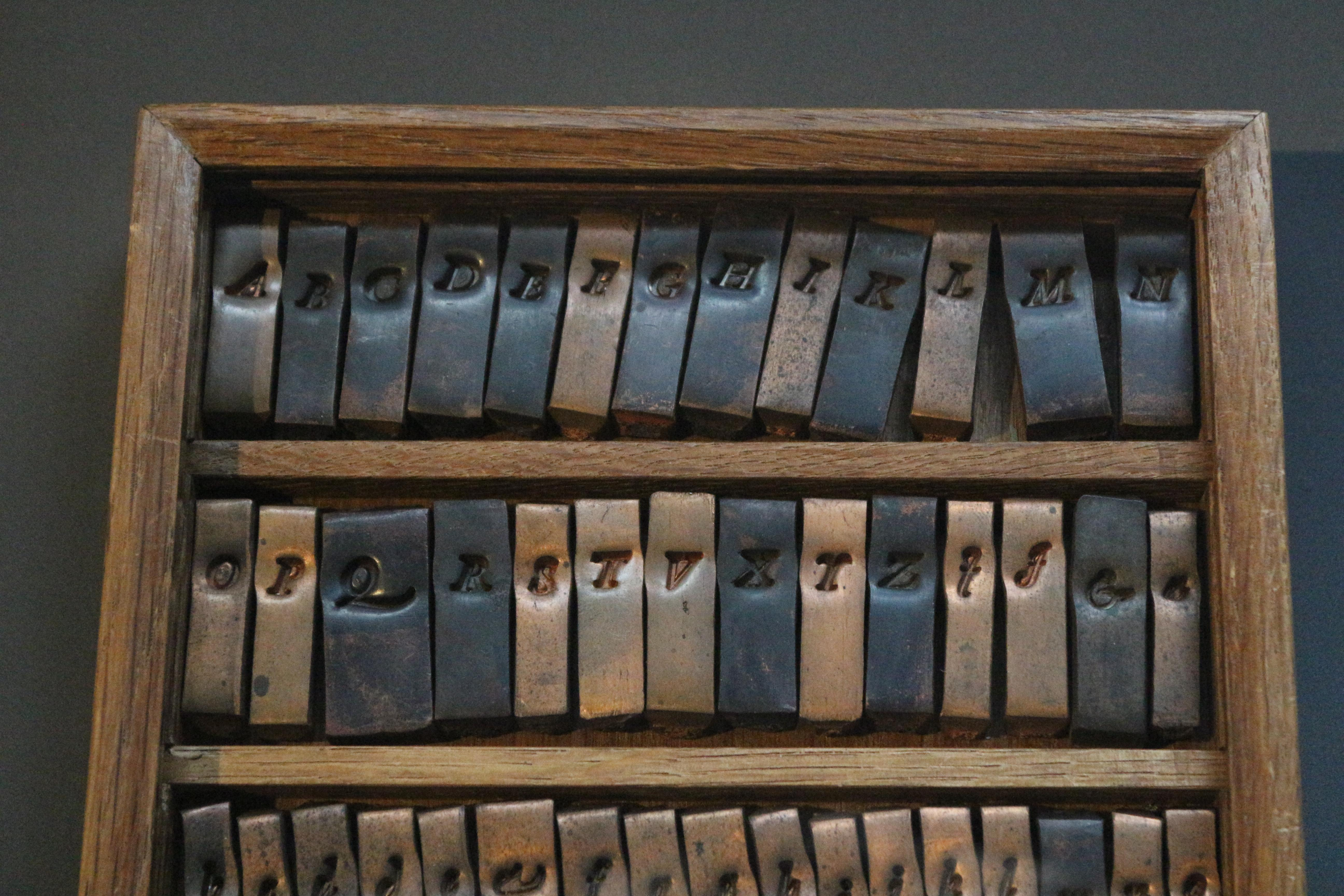
Ascendonica Cursive matrices, capitals

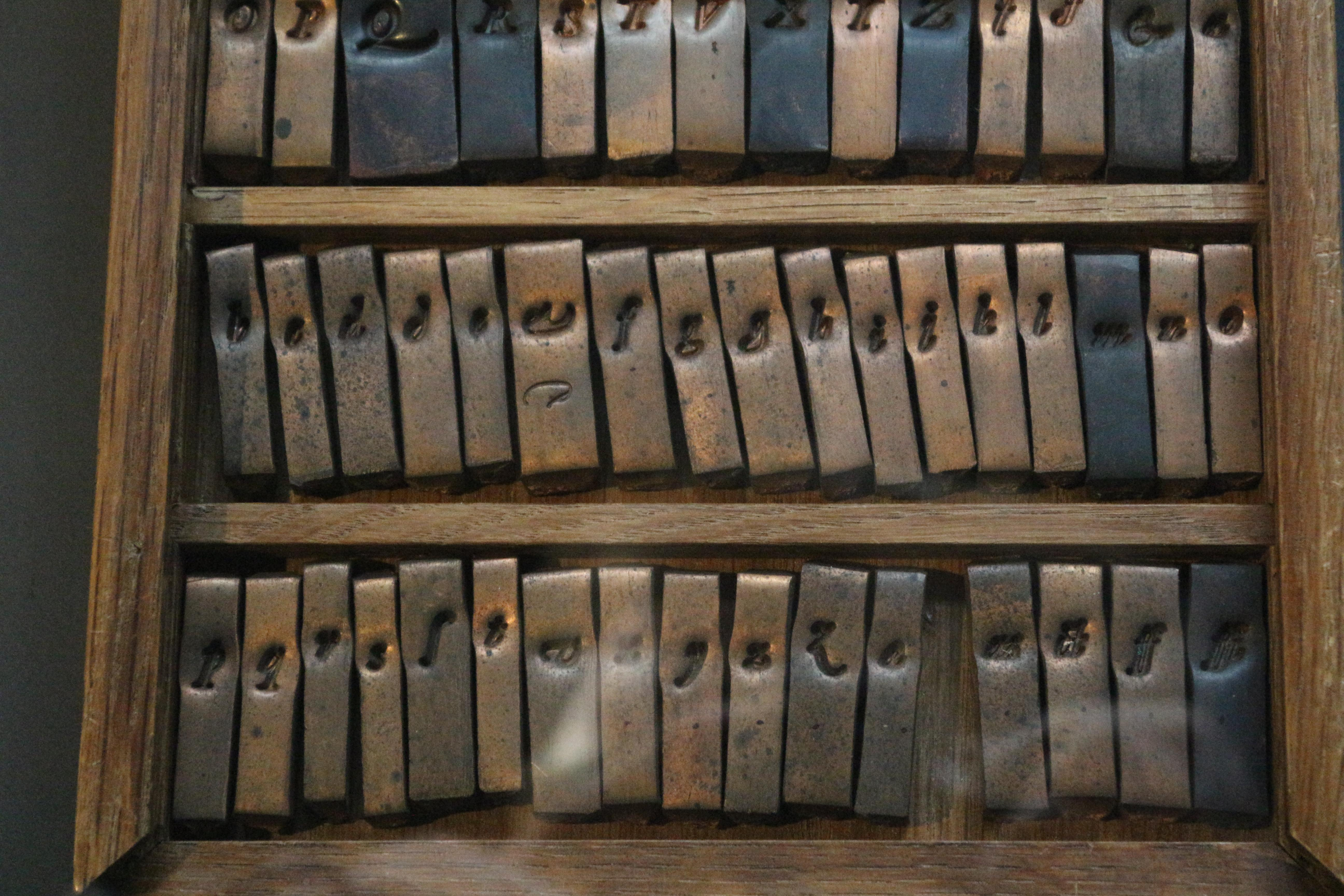
Ascendonica Cursive matrices, lower case

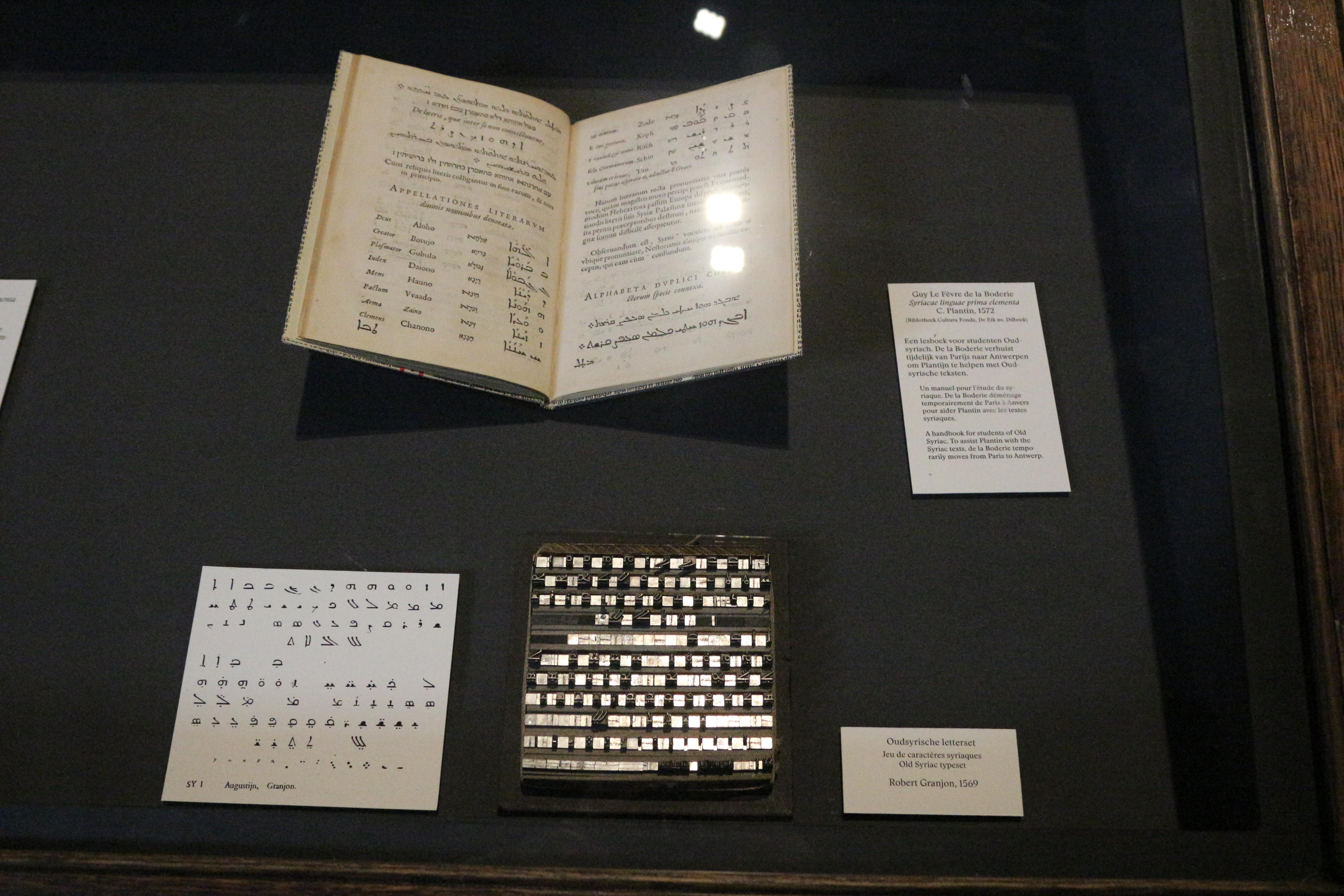
Old Syriac characters

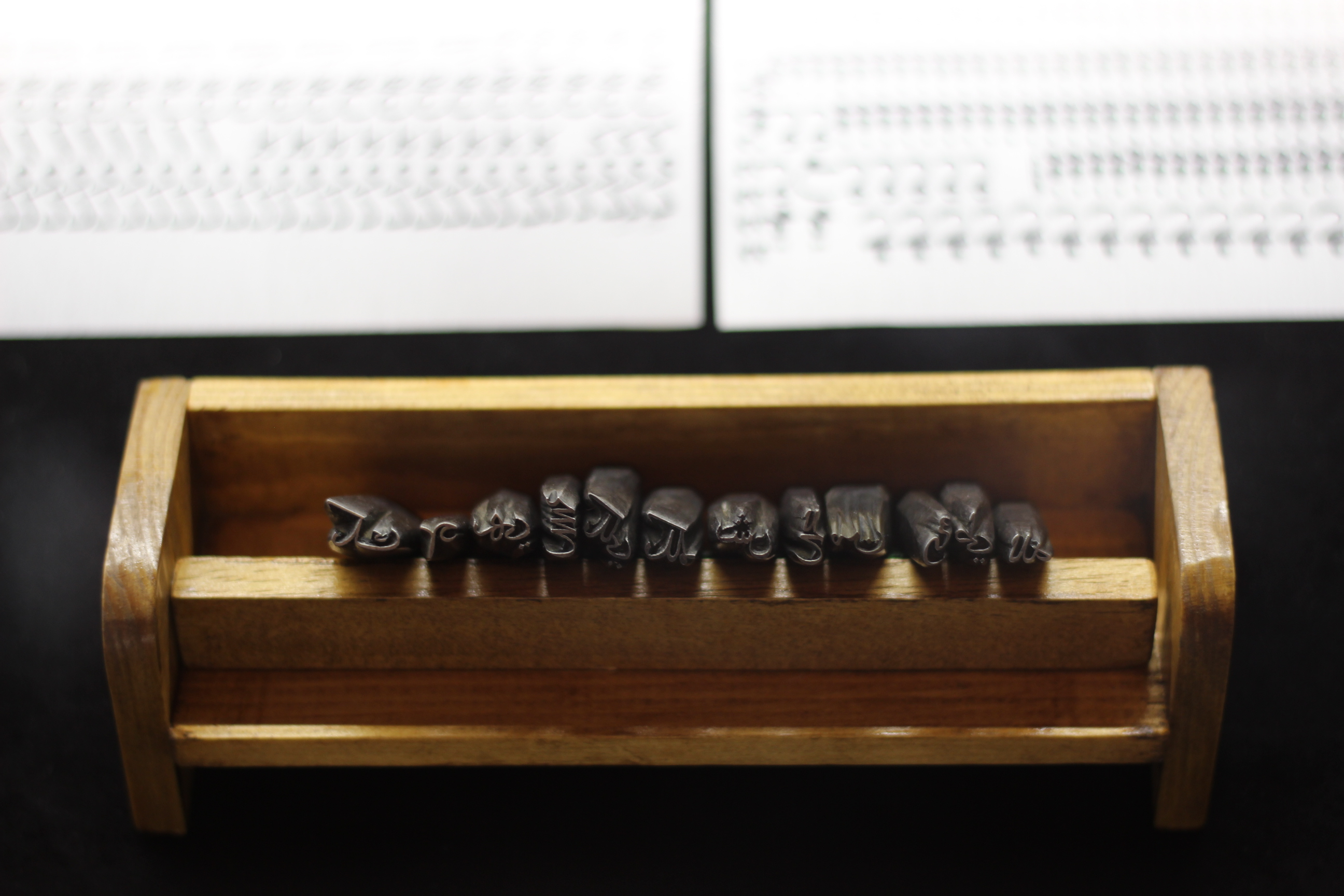
Punches for printing in Arabic, Imprimerie Nationale collection

== Typefaces inspired by Granjon’s work ==
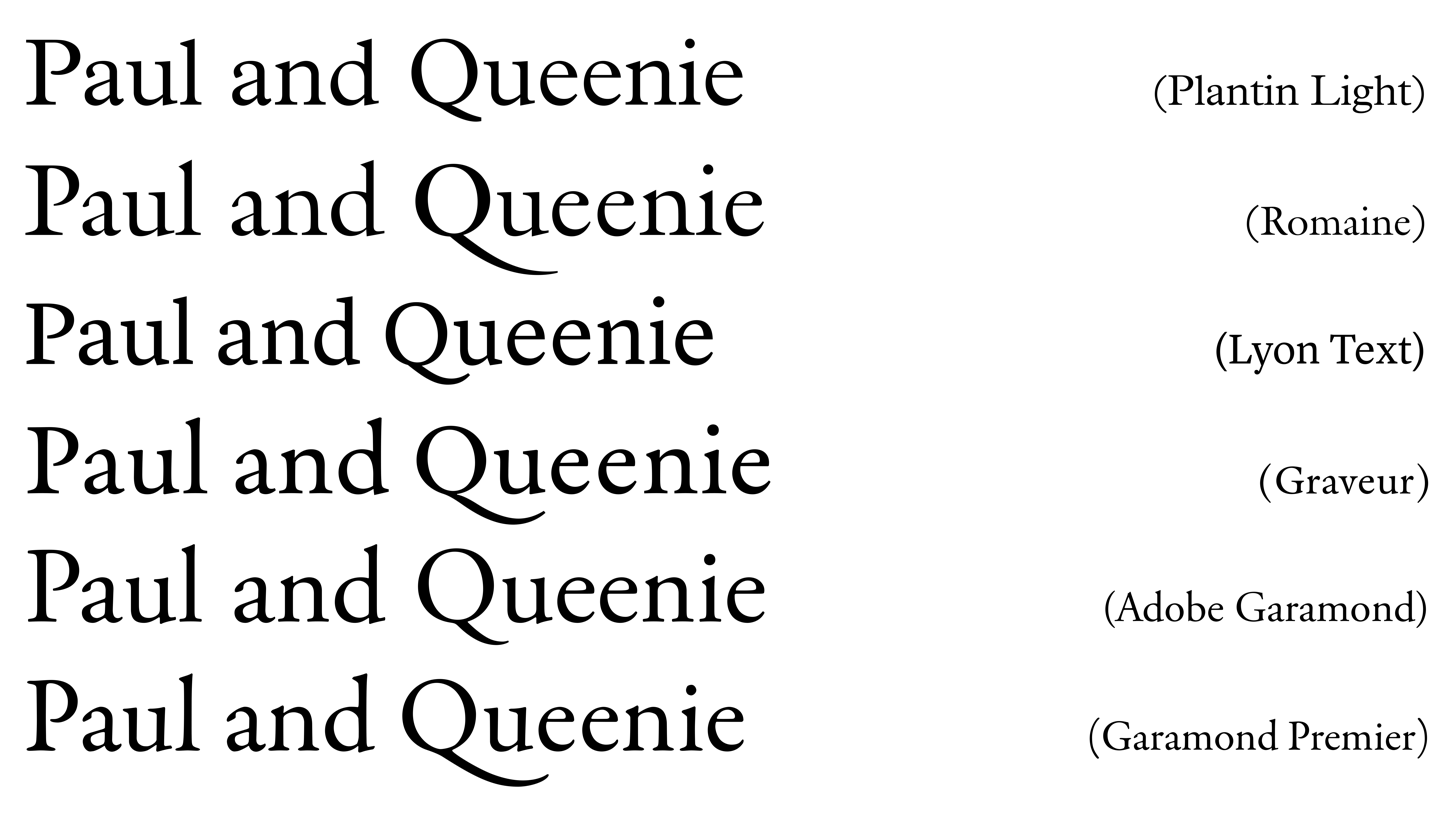
Comparisons between a number of typefaces influenced by the designs of Robert Granjon and/or Claude Garamond. A common feature among them (and most if not all typefaces mentioned on this page) is an uppercase "P" with a gap next to the vertical.

Many modern typerfaces are influenced by the designs of Robert Granjon. One of the first deliberate revivals of Granjon's type was Plantin by Frank Hinman Pierpont. Despite being named after Renaissance printer Christophe Plantin, it is based on a Gros Cicero type which is designed by Robert Granjon.

ITC Galliard by Matthew Carter, Allrounder Antiqua by Moritz Kleinsorge and Romaine by Aad van Dommelen are based on Granjon’s Ascendonica Romaine.

Lyon Text by Kai Bernau and Graveur by Juanjo López are also influenced by Granjon’s works. Graveur is not based on one single specimen, but instead a combination of multiple types by Granjon, including Parangonne Romaine and Ascendonica Romaine for its roman characters.

The roman characters of MVB Verdigris by Mark van Bronkhorst are based on Granjon’s designs, while its italics are inspired by the works of Pierre Haultin.

=== Garamond revivals ===
Because Granjon's italics were very widely used, many typefaces branded as "Garamond" use italics based on Granjon's work. Specific examples include Adobe Garamond, Garamond Premier, Sabon, Sabon Next, Granjon, and EB Garamond.
