= Kumlien =

Kumlien is a surname of Swedish origin. Notable people with the surname include:

- Akke Kumlien (1884–1949) Swedish calligrapher and graphic designer
- Axel Kumlien (1833–1913) Swedish architect
- Hjalmar Kumlien (1837–1897) Swedish architect
- Thure Kumlien (1819–1888) Swedish-American ornithologist and biologist

== See also ==
- Birgitta Kumlien-Nyheim (b. 1942) Swedish-Norwegian painter
- a typeface in the Stempel Type Foundry, named after Akke Kumlien
- Kumlien's gull
