= Continental Type Founders Association =

- Company type: Defunct
- Industry: Type foundry
- Founded: 1925
- Founder: Melbert Brinckerhoff Cary Jr.
- Headquarters: New York City
- Key people: Melbert Cary, owner, founder, Doug McMurtrie, vice-president (1925), Frederic Goudy vice-president (1927)

Continental Type Founders Association was an American type foundry founded by Melbert Brinckerhoff Cary Jr. in 1925 to distribute foundry type imported from European foundries. The influence of more modern European type design was thus felt in the United States for the first time, and American foundries responded by imitating many of the more popular faces. A.T.F.'s Paramount and Monotype's Sans Serif series are two examples of this.

== Foundries represented ==
The following foundries were represented:

- W.H. Caslon, Ltd., England
  - Caslon Old Face + Italic
- Deberny & Peignot, France
  - Astrée + Italic (1921, Robert Girard)
  - Sphinx + Italic + Inline (1925, M. Deberny)
  - Sylvan (1924, Bernard Naudin), known in France as Champlevé.
  - Bifur (1929, A.M. Cassandre)
- Joh. Enschedé en Zonen, the Netherlands (listed as "Holland" in the Continental catalog)
  - Lutetia + Italic (1925, Jan van Krimpen)
- Fundiciòn Richard Gans, Spain
  - Gloria
  - Greco Bold + Italic + Adornado (1925)
- Gebr. Klingspor, Germany
  - Kabel + Light Italic + Bold (1927-29, Rudolf Koch)
  - Zeppelin (1927-29, Koch)
  - Neuland + Inline (1923, Koch)
  - Eve + Italic + Heavy + Heavy Italic (1922, Koch), also known as Koch Antiqua and Locarno
  - Narcissus (1923, W. Tiemann)
- Ludwig & Mayer, Germany
  - Nicolas Cochin + Bold
  - La Mercure (an inline version of Cochin)
  - Erbar (Jakob Erbar)
- R.H. Stevens & Co., England
- D. Stempel A.G., Germany
  - Girder (1929, Rudolf Wolf), known in Germany as Memphis.
  - Metropolis + Bold (1929, Willy Schwerdtner)
- H. Berthold AG, Germany
  - City (1930, George Trump), not sold in US until 1936.
- Genzsch & Heyse, A.G., Germany
- J.G. Schelter & Giesecke, Germany
- Società Nebiolo, Italy
- Stephenson Blake & Co., England

Beginning in 1927 Continental also distributed faces cast by Frederic Goudy, and two faces for Doug McMurtrie. At first Goudy's type was cast at his own Village Letter Foundry, but after 1929 these were cast by the New England Foundry. Despite imports being virtually cut-off during the war years, Continental was still issuing Goudy's types as late as 1944 and may have continued functioning even later.
