= Schriftguss AG =

German type foundry

- Type: Defunct
- Industry: Type foundry
- Predecessor: Otto Ludwig Bechert Type Foundry
- Founded: 1892; 134 years ago
- Founders: Butter Brothers
- Defunct: 1951; 75 years ago
- Fate: Merged into VEB Typoart
- Successor: VEB Typoart
- Headquarters: Dresden, Germany

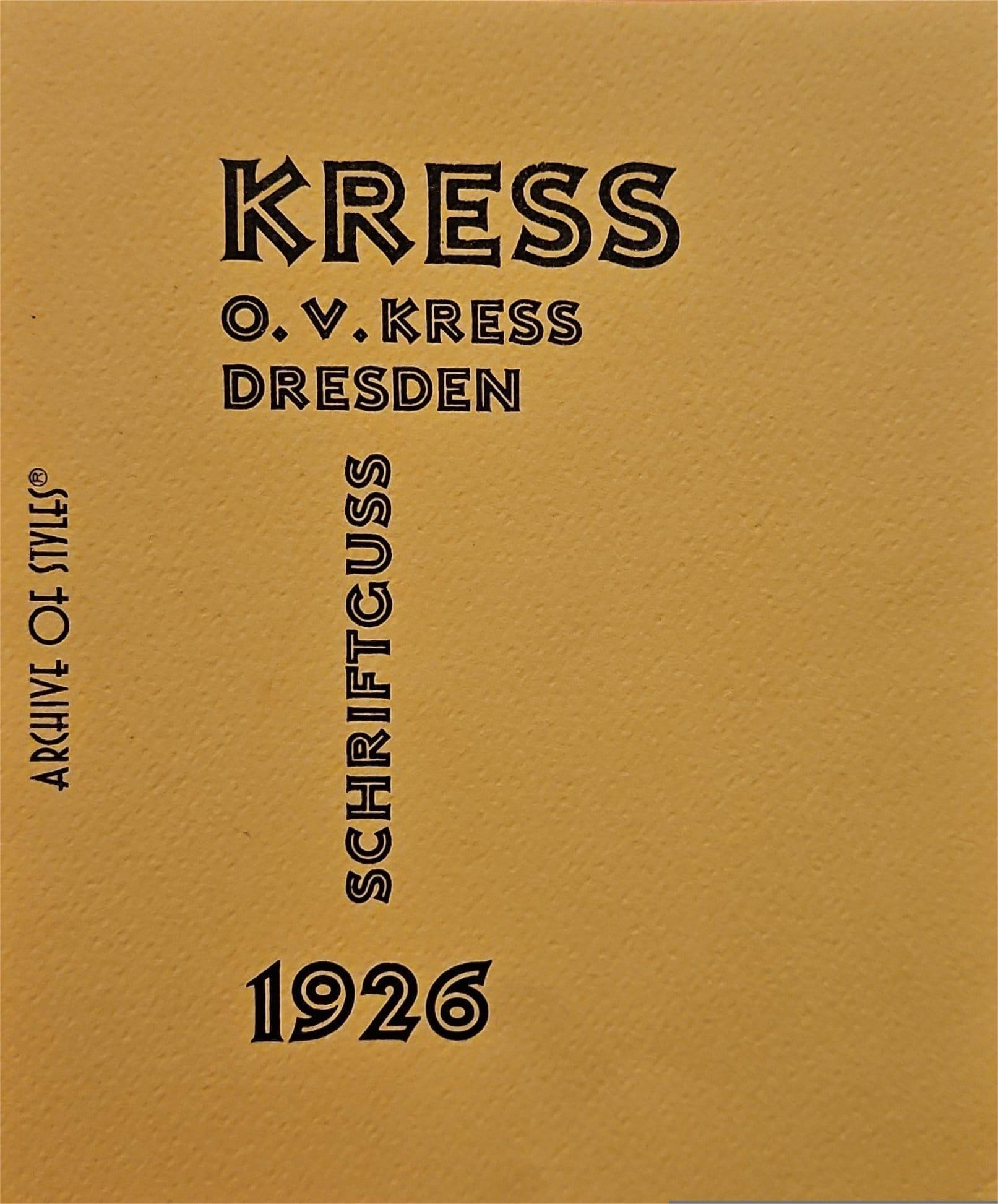
An example of the Kress typeface printed on cardstock using movable type.

Schriftguss AG was a type foundry in Germany founded in 1892 under the name Brüder Butter (“Butter Brothers”) by purchasing the type casting firm of Otto Ludwig Bechert that had been founded in 1889. It was later incorporated in 1922 as Schriftguss A.-G. vorm. [prev.] Brüder Butter. Their types were known for “vigour, liveliness and freshness.” Though some faces were done in house, the foundry mainly worked with outside “Schriftkünstler” (freelance lettering artists / type designers), more than was typical at the time. A unique product of the foundry were modular systems of “Plakattype” to compose shapes and letterforms for display and jobbing applications, for instance Dekora, or Albert Auspurg’s 1931 Ne-Po (negative–positive), and finally Super-Plakattype in 1949. After the Nazi seizure of power in 1933 the last of the Butter brothers resigned from the corporation and it was changed to a limited partnership. In 1948 the company was expropriated by the post-war communist government and became public property, under the name VEB Schriftguss Dresden, eventually becoming merged into VEB Typoart – Drucktypen, Matrizen, Messinglinien in 1951. As a state run enterprise, the foundry lost its verve and panache and settled into producing serviceable type without distinction.

== Typefaces ==
=== In-house faces ===
These type faces were produced in house by Schriftguss:

- Achilles (≤ 1911)
- Admira (1940) revived in 2019 by Coen Hofman
- Aktuell
- Albrechr-Dürer-Kanzlei (≤ 1902)
- Aldine Schmalfett
- Ambassador
- Appell (1934)
- Artista
- Belwe Antiqua Licht Versalien, capitals only.
- Bodoni
  - Bodoni fett
  - Bodoni halbfett
  - Bodoni Kursiv
- Breitkopf Fraktur
- Cursiva Minosa
- Cursiva Saxonia Preta
- Dresdner Amts-Fraktur (≤ 1911)
  - Dresdner Amts-Fraktur eng halbfett (≤ 1911)
  - Dresdner Amts-Fraktur fett (≤ 1911)
  - Dresdner Amts-Fraktur halbfett (≤ 1911)
- Druckhaus
- Duplex
- Elegant Schreibmaschinenschrift, a typewriter font.
- Else Schreibmaschinenschrift, a typewriter font.
- Etienne habfett
- Eugenie (typeface) (≤ 1914)
- Fanal
- Fette Copra Kursiv
- Fette Gotisch
- Filigran fein + halbfett (≤ 1911)
- Flamme
- Fundament Schreibschrift, a script face.
- Gilden-Fraktur (1937)
- Gladiator
- Grossmuetterchen
- Grotesca VI Mercur
- Grotesk
- Grotesk Breite + halbfett
- Gutenberg Fraktur + halbfett (≤ 1914)
- Hamberger Römisch + halbfett, also known as Romana Hamburguesa.
  - Hamberger Römisch Kursiv + halbfett
- Hansa Fraktur + halbfett
  - Hansa Fraktur eng halbfett
  - Hansa Fraktur fett
  - Hansa Fraktur halbfett
- Härtel Antiqua + halbfett(1928)
- Härtel Kursiv
- Helion
- Hellerau Type (1928)
- Hollandeza Larga
- Jasmin (1929), a blackletter face.
- Jean-Paul-Schrift (1798) Also known as Jean-Paul-Fraktur
- Junior
- Künstler Grotesk breit (≤ 1905)
  - Künstler Grotesk schmal + licht (≤ 1911)
- Künstler Skelet breit + schmal (≤ 1911)
- Kurier
- Kursachen (1937)
- Leucht Grotesk Versalien (1932), capitals only.
- Lichte Gotisch Gertraud (≤ 1911)
- Linkoln Gotisch(≤ 1921)
- Marko (≤ 1921)
- Maximum
- Minaret (≤ 1911)
- Nero (≤ 1914)
- Otfried + licht (≤ 1905)
  - Otfried fett (≤ 1914)
- Parlament
- Patricio (1931)
- Pfeil Antiqua + Kursiv + halbfett + breit + schmalhalbfett (≤ 1921), a Plakattype (poster type).
- Ramona
- Rautendelein, a calligraphic typeface revived by Ralph M. Unger in 2017 as Carina Pro
- Reklame Grotesk (≤ 1914)
- Rembrandt Fraktur + halbfett
- Rembrandt Meia Preta
- Rhythmus, revived in digital form by Ralph M. Unger as Rhythmus Pro in 2016 and by Peter Wiegel in 2015 as CAT Rhythmus
- Romantisch
- Römisch breitfett
- Saskia
- Schraffierte Gotisch Gertraud (≤ 1911)
- Schreibmaschinenschrift 512, a typewriter face.
- Sirius
- Steinschrift
- Super Buchtype (1950)
- Tausendschoen
- Unger Fraktur (original)
- Unger Neuschnitt Fraktur (1928)
  - Unger Neuschnitt Fraktur halbfett (1929)
- Wiener Römisch + schmal + schmalhalbfet (≤ 1914)
- Zeitungs Cursiv
- Zeitungs-Egyptienne

=== Spanish faces ===
A 1925 Schriftguss catalog in Spanish includes these and other typefaces, vignettes, and “tipos de cartel”:

- Cursiva Minosa
- Cursiva Saxonia Preta
- Grotesca VI Mercur
- Hollandeza Larga
- Rembrandt Meia Preta
- Romana Hamburguesa
- Versaes Kress
- Versaes Schaefer
- Wieynk Gothic

=== Out-of-house designs ===
- Aktuell (1935, Walter Schnippering)
- Arpke Antiqua (1928, Otto Arpke), there is also a light and a shaded version.
- Armin-Gotisch (1933, Fritz Müller)
- Blickfang Schmuck (1927, Karl Hermann Schaefer)
- Capitol (1931, Karl Hermann Schaefer) This face was revised as Capitol Pro in 2012 by Ralph M. Unger for his own RMU Foundry.
- Cito Versalien (1930, Karl Hermann Schaefer), capitals only.
- Demeter (1922, Peter A. Demeter), later cast by VEB Typoart. This is one of a few German faces BB&S in Chicago received in exchange for rights to the Cooper types.
- Demeter Schraffiert (1922, Peter A. Demeter)
- Diamant (1937, Johannes Lehmann)
- Divina (1930, W. Berg)
- Drescher Versalien (1927, Arno Drescher), capitals only.
- Duplex (1937, Arno Drescher)
- Echo (1938, Peterpaul Weiss)
- Edelweiß (1937, Carl Albert Fahrenwaldt)
- Energos (1932, Arno Drescher)
- Fao (1938, H.-R. Müller), Nick Curtis used this as the basis for his Fargo Faro (2007).
- Faro (1938, Henry Reinhard Moller)
- Fatima (1933, Karl Hermann Schaefer)
- Geperlte Fournier (1922, Peter A. Demeter) Also called Pearl Fournier and called Dresden when it was later published by BB&S in Chicago.
- Gladiator (1940, Hans Möhring)
- Golf (1935, Henry Reinhard Moller)
- Helion (1935, Arno Drescher)
- Holländish series (Peter A. Demeter)
  - Holländish breit (1926)
  - Holländish fett (1925)
  - Holländish licht (1922)
- Intermezzo (1933, Albert Auspurg)
- Klinger Type (1925, Julius Klinger), also known as Typo Klinger.
  - Klinger Type habfett (1927, Julius Klinger)
- Klinger Kursiv (1927, Julius Klinger)
- Kreß Versalien (1926, Oskar von Kress), an in-line capitals face. Agfa’s Ashley Inline is a digital version of his font.
- Kursachsen Auszeichnung (1937, Peterpaul Weiss)
- Kursachsen Grundschrift (1937, Peterpaul Weiss)
- Lehmann-Fraktur (1919, K. Lehmann)
  - Lehmann-Fraktur kräftig (1920, K. Lehmann)
- Lido (1936, Albert Auspurg)
- Luxor (1934, Paul Sinkwitz)
- Marggraff-Deutsch a blackletter face by Gerhardt Marggraff) that included a Halbfette and Fette (both 1939) and a Leichte (1940)
- Marggraff Kursiv (1929, Gerhardt Marggraff)
  - Marggraff Kursiv fett (1928, Gerhardt Marggraff)
  - Marggraff Kursiv leicht (1929, Gerhardt Marggraff)
- Marggraff-Deutsch fett + halbfett (1939, Gerhardt Marggraff)
- Marggraff-Deutsch leicht (1940, Gerhardt Marggraff)
- Maximum A + B (1939, Henry Reinhard Moller)
- Mendelsohn Grotesk + halbfett (1939, G. von Mendelsohn)
- Mendelsohn Type (1921, G. von Mendelsohn)
- Milo (1940, Arno Drescher)
- Minister Antiqua + Kursiv + schmalhalbfett (1929, Carl Albert Fahrenwaldt)
  - Minister Antiqua fett + halbfett (1930, Carl Albert Fahrenwaldt)
  - Minister Kreis Versalien (1933, Carl Albert Fahrenwaldt), a white on black titling font.
  - Prominent (1936, Carl Albert Fahrenwaldt), decorative initials based on Minister
  - Symbol (1933, Carl Albert Fahrenwaldt), decorative initials based on Minister
- Ne-Po (1934, Albert Auspurg) A modular set of patterned blocks for building letters and other ornamentation, consisting of a negative (“NE”) and a positive (“PO”) series. American Type Founders released a version in 1944 called Alpha-Blox.
- Ondina (1935, Karl Kranke)
- Orchidea (1937, Karl Hermann Schaefer)
- Originell (1935, Walter Schnippering)
- Patria (1938, Henry Reinhard Moller)
  - Patria fett (1938, Henry Reinhard Moller)
  - Patria halbfett (1938, Henry Reinhard Moller)
  - Patria Kursiv (1941, Henry Reinhard Moller)
  - Patria Kursiv halbfett (1938, Henry Reinhard Moller)
  - Patria Werkschrift (1942, Henry Reinhard Moller)
  - Patria Werkschrift halbfett (1942, Henry Reinhard Moller)
- Pentape (1935, Walter Schnippering)
- Piehler Schmuck (1922, August Piehler), type ornaments.
- Piehler Schrift (1922, August Piehler)
  - Piehler Schrift Kursiv (1923, August Piehler)
- Ramona (1939, Henry Reinhard Moller)
- Regatta (1935, Henry Reinhard Moller)
- Schaefer Versalien (1927, Karl Hermann Schaefer), capitals only.
- Schreibedeutsch + kräftig (1934, Walter Schnippering)
- Sinkwitz-Gotisch (1942, Paul Sinkwitz), a script face in three weights., later reissued by Typoart in 1966.
- Splendor (1937, W. Berg), a script face.
  - Splendor kräftig (1939, W. Berg)
  - Splendor extrakräftig
- Stadion Grotesk (1929, Erhard Grundeis)
- Super Blickfang Initialen (1932, Arno Drescher)
- Super Elektrik (1931, Arno Drescher)
- Super Grotesk (1930, Arno Drescher)
  - Super Grotesk dreiviertelfett (1930, Arno Drescher)
  - Super Grotesk fett (1930, Arno Drescher)
  - Super Grotesk halbfett (Arno Drescher)
  - Super Grotesk Kursiv (1931, Arno Drescher)
  - Super Grotesk Kursiv fett (1938, Arno Drescher)
  - Super Grotesk Kursiv halbfett (1931, Arno Drescher)
  - Super Grotesk schmalmager (1933, Arno Drescher)
  - Super Grotesk schmalfett (1933, Arno Drescher)
  - Super Grotesk schmalhalbfett (1933, Arno Drescher)
- Super Reflex (1931, Arno Drescher)
- Supremo Versalien (1932, Karl Kranke), capitals only.
- Thannhaeuser Schrift (1929, Herbert Thannhaeuser )
  - Thannhaeuser Schrift Kursiv (1933, Herbert Thannhaeuser )
  - Thannhaeuser Schrift halbfett (1934, Herbert Thannhaeuser )
- Trio A + B + C (1936, Henry Reinhard Moller)
- Troubadour Magere (1927, Willy Schumann)
- Wieynck Gotisch (1926, Heinrich Wieynck), digitized by Gerhard Helzel.
  - Wieynck Gotisch licht (1929, Heinrich Wieynck), digitized by Gerhard Helzel.
  - Wieynck Gotisch Werkschrift (1930, Heinrich Wieynck)
- Zeus (1931, Jan Tschichold)

=== Faces originally cast by other foundries ===
These type faces were produced by other foundries and licensed by Schriftguss:

- Aida, originally made by B. Krebs Foundry.
- Ambassador (1938), originally made by Woellmer Type Foundry.
- Burgund (1938, Martin Wilke), originally made by Woellmer Type Foundry.
- Butterfly (1927, Willy Schumann), originally made by Wagner & Schmidt.
  - Butterfly Halbfette (1928, Willy Schumann)
- Carmen, originally made by B. Krebs Foundry.
- Copra, originally made by Barnhart Brothers & Spindler as Cooper Black. The series included the following faces:
  - Copra Antiqua
  - Copra Antiqua fett
  - Copra Antiqua halbfett
  - Copra Kursiv
  - Copra Kursiv fett
  - Copra Kursiv licht
- Diva, originally made by Ludwig & Mayer.
- Elegant Kursiv (1938), originally made by Woellmer Type Foundry.
- Esprit, originally made by B. Krebs Foundry.
- Feudal, originally made by B. Krebs Foundry.
- Gilden Fraktur (1938), originally made by Woellmer Type Foundry.
  - Gilden Fraktur halbfett (1938), originally made by Woellmer Type Foundry.
- Jupiter (≤ 1921), originally made by Wagner & Schmidt.
- Kabinett, originally made by B. Krebs Foundry.
- Kasino, originally made by B. Krebs Foundry.
- Liebing Gotisch (≤ 1921), originally made by Wagner & Schmidt.
- Lohengrin (1938), originally made by Woellmer Type Foundry.
- Mars (≤ 1921), originally made by Wagner & Schmidt.
- Merkur (≤ 1921), originally made by Wagner & Schmidt.
- Mimosa + Kursiv + halbfett (≤ 1914), originally made by Linotype as Copperplate Gothic.
- Mirabelle + habfett (≤ 1921), originally made by Wagner & Schmidt.
- Neptun (≤ 1921), originally made by Wagner & Schmidt.
- Ohio + Ohio Kursiv, originally made by American Type Founders as Pabst Oldstyle.
  - Ohio Kraft (1922), a variant on Pabst Oldstyle, designed in house by Eduard Lauterbach.
- Orion (≤ 1921), originally made by Wagner & Schmidt.
- Pallas (≤ 1921), originally made by Wagner & Schmidt.
- Pfeil Antiqua, originally made by American Type Founders as Cheltenham.
- Picadilly (1934), originally made by either Berthold Type Foundry or Woellmer Type Foundry.
- Planeta (≤ 1921), originally made by Wagner & Schmidt.
- Presto, originally made by B. Krebs Foundry.
- Saturn (≤ 1921), originally made by Wagner & Schmidt.
- Saxonia Kursive + fett, originally made by Wagner & Schmidt. The bold (“fett”) was later cast by Linotype.
- Standard I + II + III, originally made by B. Krebs Foundry.
- Tiffany Shaded, originally made by American Type Founders as Typo Shaded.
- Ultra series, originally made by Ludwig & Mayer around 1935.
  - Ultra fett
  - Ultra halbfett
  - Ultra kräftig
  - Ultra leicht
  - Ultra schmalhalbfett
  - Ultra Werkschrift
- Uranus (≤ 1921), originally made by Wagner & Schmidt.
- Violetta, originally made by B. Krebs Foundry.
- Walhalla, originally made by Ludwig & Mayer, later digitized by Gerhard Helzel.
- Wedding Text, originally made by American Type Founders.
- Wellington + fett (≤ 1921), originally made by Inland Type Foundry.
