= Trajan (typeface) =

Typeface

Adobe Trajan
- Category: Serif
- Classification: Incised
- Designers: Carol Twombly and Robert Slimbach
- Foundry: Adobe Type
- Date released: 1989

Trajan is a serif typeface designed in 1989 by Carol Twombly for Adobe.

The design is based on the letterforms of capitalis monumentalis or Roman square capitals, as used for the inscription at the base of Trajan's Column, hence the name. Trajan is an all-capitals typeface, as the Romans did not use lowercase letters on monumental inscriptions. Twombly created the design taking inspiration from a full-size picture of a rubbing of the inscription. It is well known for appearing on many film posters.

== Background ==
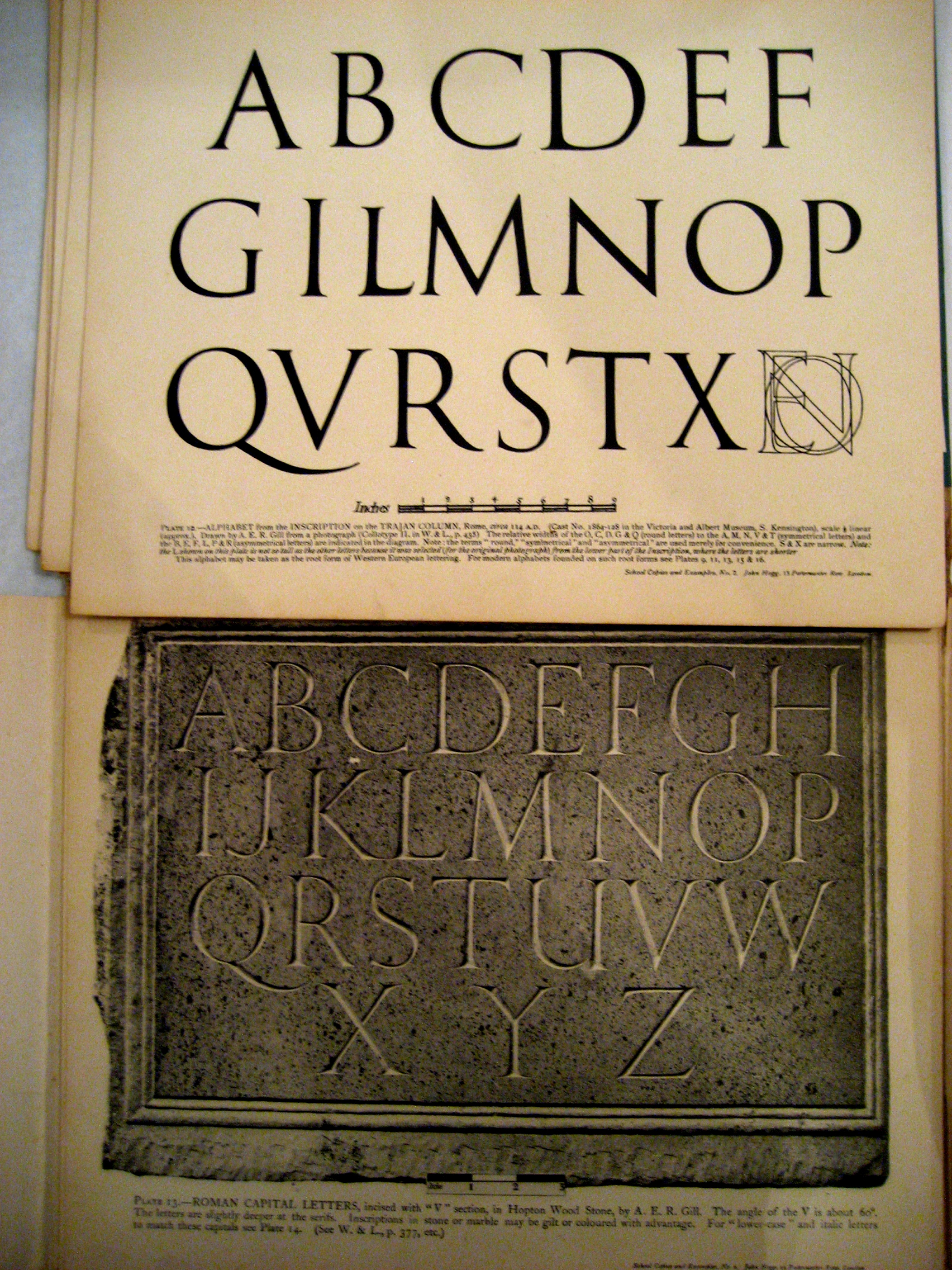
A drawing and a photograph of a carving (in Hopton Wood Stone) by Eric Gill, made in the early twentieth century, inspired by the "Trajan" capitals on Trajan's Column

The capitals on Trajan's Column have long been an inspiration to many artists and students of lettering. The calligrapher and type designer Edward Johnston in his book Writing & Illuminating & Lettering (1906) wrote that "the Roman capitals have held the supreme place among letters for readableness and beauty. They are the best forms for the grandest and most important inscriptions." Trajan letterforms were used for many years for signs in British public buildings, including government offices.

Twombly's translation of the Trajan inscription into type is quite crisp and faithful. Many looser interpretations (often with an invented lowercase) predate Twombly's, particularly Emil Rudolf Weiss' "Weiss" of 1926, Frederic Goudy's Forum Title, Hadriano and "Goudy Trajan", and Diotima by Gudrun Zapf-von Hesse, while Warren Chappell's "Trajanus" of 1939, while having similar forms for capitals has a markedly medieval lowercase. Many other examples of lettering and typefaces are based on Roman capitals, for instance lettering made under the influence of the Arts and Crafts movement in the nineteenth and twentieth centuries. Alastair Johnston's 1990 review of Trajan noted this heritage, saying that it "outdoes anything old Fred Goudy ever produced."

Trajan was designed for display instead of printed text – specifically for use in large sizes.

Twombly's digitisation of Trajan has become very popular, as seen in its widespread presence on movie posters, television shows, and book covers. A bold weight was added to Trajan when it was made digital.

Twombly retired from Adobe and type design in 1999, but Adobe has continued to release versions in consultation with her. Trajan Pro was the initial OpenType version, which added central European language support and added small caps in the lowercase slots. In 2012 the existing OpenType version was significantly revised as "Trajan Pro 3," with Robert Slimbach adding four additional weights as well as Cyrillic and Greek glyphs. Adobe has also released a "Trajan Sans" companion face, forming a font superfamily. Neither version supports the archaic Latin vowels long I or apex-V.
