= Peter A. Demeter =

German bookbinder, printer and publisher (1875-1939)

- Born: 10 January 1875
- Died: 23 May 1938 (aged 63)
- Known for: typography

Peter A. Demeter was a German designer at the Weber Typefoundry.

== Fonts Designed ==
- Demeter (1922, Schriftguss Type Foundry, later Typoart) This is one of a few German faces BB&S in Chicago received in exchange for rights to the Cooper types.
- Demeter Schraffiert (1922, Schriftguss Type Foundry
- Dresden, decorative face, for Schriftgus A.G. Dresden, cut by Barnhart Brothers & Spindler in 1925, 12-30pt
- Fournier (1922, probably Schriftguss Type Foundry, later Typoart)
- Holländisch (1922 - 1926, Weber Typefoundry), shaded roman capitals in regular, bold, and extended.
- Pearl Fournier (1922, probably Schriftguss Type Foundry). In Germany this is known as Geperlte Fournier and called Dresden when it was later published by BB&S in Chicago.
