= Ilerda (disambiguation) =

Ilerda may refer to:

- Ilerda, a synonym for the lycaenid butterfly genus Heliophorus
- Hesperia ilerda, a synonym for Gretna waga species of butterfly
- Ilerda, the name of Lleida in Spain in Ancient Roman times
  - Battle of Ilerda, 49BC
- Ilerda, a typeface of Nacional Typefoundry, Spain
