= Imprenta y fundición tipográfica Richard Gans =

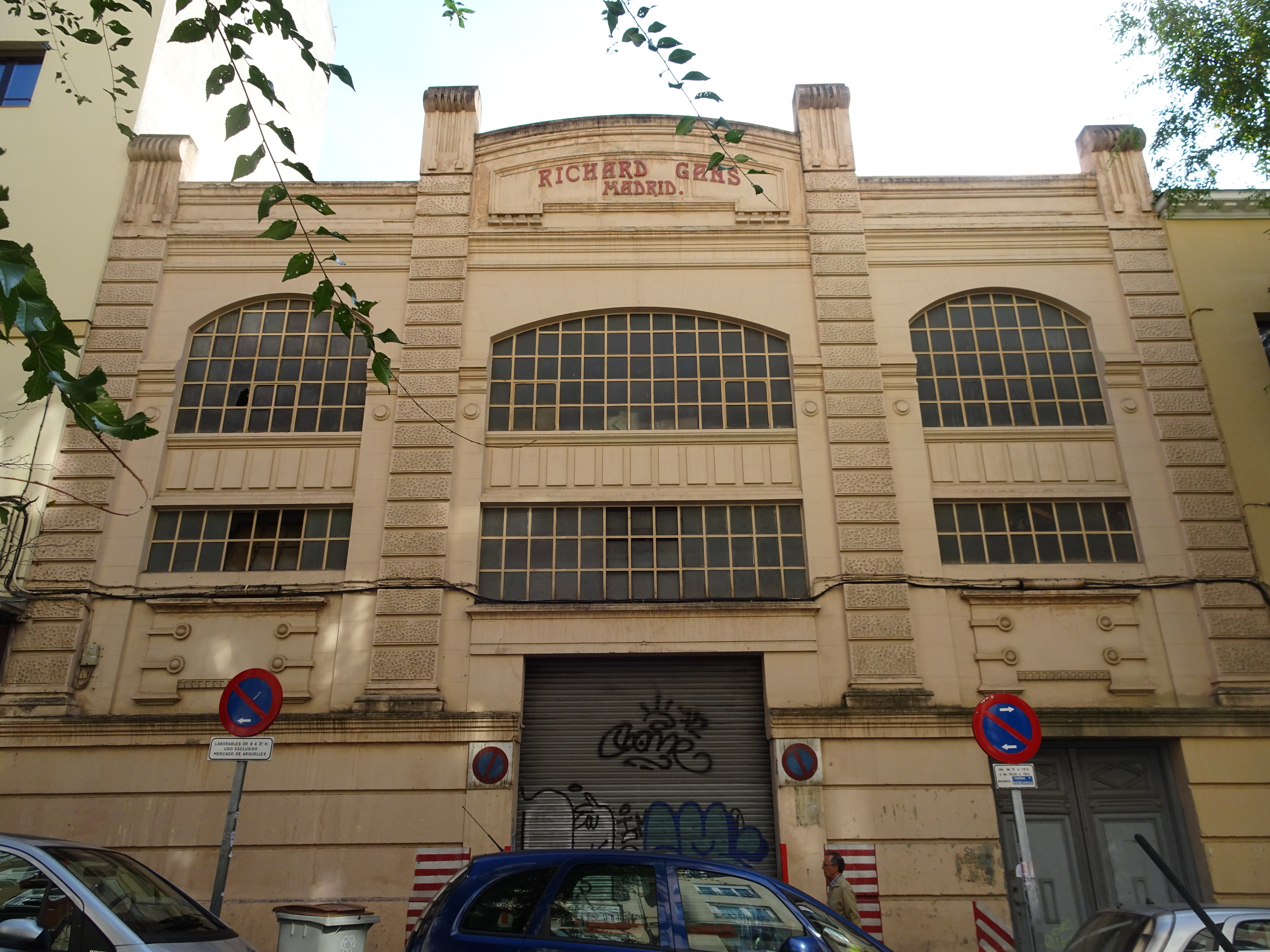
- Type: Defunct
- Industry: Type Foundry
- Founded: 1888
- Founder: Richard Gans
- Defunct: 1975
- Headquarters: Madrid, Spain
- Area served: Worldwide
- Products: foundry type.

Imprenta y fundición tipográfica Richard Gans was a type foundry in business from 1888–1975. Founder, Richard Gans was the son of a doctor from Karlsbad, Austria who emigrated to Spain in 1874 where he founded the business in 1888. After his death in 1925 the foundry was led by Mauricio Wiesenthal until 1936. In the 1920s and 30s, Gans types were sold in the United States by Continental Type Founders Association.

Richard Gans' children, Ricardo, Manuel and Amalia Gans Gimeno took over operations in 1936, but Ricardo and Manuel were assassinated in the Civil War only a few months later. During the war the foundry was used to make ammunition. Amalia Gans rebuilt the business after the war, and remained in charge until the business closed in 1975.

== Type Design ==
Before 1925, the foundry cast almost no original types, taking designs from German foundries, principally those of the Woellmer Type Foundry and Edmund Koch. Later types were designed by a number of people from within and outside the foundry including Jose Ausejo Matute, Antonio Bilbao, the founder's son Ricardo Gans, and Carlos Winkow.

=== Typefaces ===
==== Exported Typefaces ====
- Atlantida
- Dalia (1931), known as Ibarra Vaciada in Spain.
- Egipcia Progreso (1923)
- Gloria (c. 1930), known in Spain as Fulgor.
- Greco (1925), sold in Spain as Antigua El Greco, also sold by Stevens, Shanks & Sons Ltd. as Bristol and Rosart.
- Ibarra (1931, Carlos Winkow), known in Spain as Elzeviriano Ibarra, digitized in 2011 by Lucia Walter.
- Italiana Cursiva (1951)
- Juventud (1950, Joan Trochut-Blanchard), known in Spain as Escritura Juventud, released by Française as Muriel, digitized by Canada Type as Blanchard.
- Progresso (1923)

==== Typefaces Sold Only In Spain ====
- Aldine
- Americanas (Tuscan style), a late 19th-century style display face.
- Americanas-Titular, a late 19th-century style display face.
- Anchas Americanas
- Antigua Adornada, a late 19th-century style display face.
- Antigua Manuscrito (Hermann Delitsch)
- Antigua Progreso (1923)
- Antigua
- Arabe
- Atlántida
- Azures
- Bodoni and Bodoni Redonda
- Carmen Adornada, a late 19th-century style display face.
- Carmen, a late 19th-century style display face.
- Cartel
- Cursiva Comercial
- Egipcia
- Elzevirianas Adornadas, a late 19th-century style display face.
- Elzeviriano
- Escorial, (1960, Antonio Bilbao)
- Españolas Adornadas, a late 19th-century style display face.
- Espanolas
- Etienne Ancha
- Filetes de Bronce
- Filetes de Metal
- Fulgor (1930)
- Gacela
- Gaviota
- Gloria Reformada, (1930)
- Gótico Cervantes, (1928)
- Gótico Globo
- Gótico Uncial
- Graciosa
- Griego
- Grotesca Ancha
- Grotesca Antigua
- Grotesca Chupada
- Grotesca Colón
- Grotesca Compacta
- Grotesca Cursiva
- Grotesca Estrecha Hercules
- Grotesca Favorita, Grotesca Reformada
- Grotesca Ideal
- Grotesca Mercantil
- Grotesca Mercurio
- Grotesca Negra Cursiva
- Grotesca Radio
- Helenica
- Helios (1920s)
- Imán
- Inglesa Excelsior
- Luxor
- Manos
- Maquina de Escrebir
- Maruxa
- Normanda
- Nueva Antigua #1 & #2
- Orlas de Linea
- Preciosa
- Primavera
- Radio Bicolor
- Radio Gris (1930)
- Radio Lumina
- Regina (1920s)
- Renacimiento Ancha
- Romana I
- Royalty
- Senefelder
- Talla Dulce
- Tipo Sombreado
- Tipos Adornados
- Tipos de Adorno, a late 19th-century style display face.
- Tipos de Texto
- Titania (1933)
- Utopian, a late 19th-century style display face.
- Velázquez, a late 19th-century style display face.
- Veneziana Negra
- Vulcano (1920s), copied by Ludlow as Vulcan Bold.
