= Johannes Wagner =

Johannes Wagner may refer to:

- Honus Wagner (1874–1955, Johannes Peter Wagner), American baseball shortstop
- Johannes Wagner (politician) (born 1991), German physician and politician
- Johannes Wagner, founder in 1921 of the Johannes Wagner Type Foundry
