= Astur =

Astur may refer to:

- an inhabitant of the northwest of Hispania - see Astures
- Astur (bird), a bird genus (formerly included in the genus Accipiter)
- Astur (typeface)
- Astur CF, a Spanish football club
- Manuel Astur (born 1980), Spanish writer and journalist
