= Tom Paine: Freedom's Apostle =

1957 children's biography

- Author: Leo Gurko
- Illustrator: Fritz Kredel
- Language: English
- Genre: Children's literature
- Publisher: Thomas Y. Crowell Co.
- Publication date: 1957
- Publication place: United States

Tom Paine: Freedom's Apostle is a 1957 children's biography of American founding father Thomas Paine written by Leo Gurko and illustrated by Fritz Kredel. It covers Paine's early life in England, meeting Benjamin Franklin and emigrating to the 13 colonies in 1774, the publishing of Common Sense, his return to England and the writing of Rights of Man, his flight to France to avoid arrest, his imprisonment during the Reign of Terror and completion of The Age of Reason, his release from prison and return to the United States in 1802, and finally his death in relative obscurity and povery in 1809. The book earned a Newbery Honor in 1958.
