= Martin Wilke =

Type designer (b. 1903, d. 1993)

- Born: 1903; Berlin, Germany
- Died: 1993 (aged 89–90); Berlin, Germany
- Known for: typography

Martin Wilke (1903–1993) was a German type designer, mostly of script faces. He studied at the School of Arts and Crafts or School of Applied Arts in Berlin in 1921. After 1923, he was hired by studio of Wilhelm Deffke and later became an independent graphic designer.

== Fonts designed ==
- Ariston (1933-1936, Berthold Type Foundry), cut in a light, medium, and bold.
- Bergund (Schriftguss Type Foundry)
- Berolina
- Caprice (1939, Berthold Type Foundry)
- Discus (1939, Stempel Type Foundry), cut in a medium and a bold. Also known as Discus Halbfett.
- Essentia
- Gladiola (1936, Stempel Type Foundry).
- Halftone
- Moira
- New Berolina (1965, Monotype).
- Palette (1951, Berthold Type Foundry).
- Picadilly (1968, Berthold Type Foundry)
- Wilke (1988, Linotype)
- Wilke-Kursiv (1932, Woellmer Type Foundry)
- Wilke Versalien (1933, Woellmer Type Foundry)
