= Kuenstler Script =

Kuenstler
- Category: Formal script
- Designer(s): Hans Bohn
- Foundry: D Stempel AG
- Date created: 1902

Kuenstler Script is a formal script typeface. The primary weight was designed in 1902 by the in-house studio at the D Stempel AG foundry. It was originally titled Künstlerschreibschrift, which translates from German to English as "handwriting of artists". The face is based on late nineteenth-century English copperplate scripts. Those faces in turn took inspiration from earlier eighteenth century writing masters George Bickham and George Shelley, both of whom worked in a writing style called round hand. In 1957, Hans Bohn added to the typeface family with Kuenstler Script Black, a heavy weight of the face.
