= Hiero Rhode =

German type designer

- Born: 30 June 1903; Saxony, Germany
- Died: 21 February 1954 (aged 50); Berlin, Germany
- Known for: Typography

Johannes Anton Hieronymus Rhode (1903-1954), known professionally as Hiero Rhode, was a German type designer.

== Fonts Designed ==
- Humboldt Fraktur (1938, Stempel Type Foundry), named after the German researcher Alexander von Humboldt. Digitized by Helzel, Delbanco (2001, as DS Humboldt Fraktur), Gerhard Helzel, and Dieter Steffmann (2002).
  - Humboldt Fraktur halbfett (1938)
  - Humboldt Fraktur Bierbuchftaben (1938)
- Hiero Rhode Roman (1945, Johannes Wagner Type Foundry), matching italic by Karl Hans Walter.
  - Hiero Rhode Roman fett (1945)
- Hiero Rhode Antiqua (1944, Johannes Wagner Type Foundry), digitized by Ari Rafaeli (2006).
  - Hiero Rhode Antiqua fett (1946)
