= Douglas Crawford McMurtrie =

American typeface designer (1888–1944)

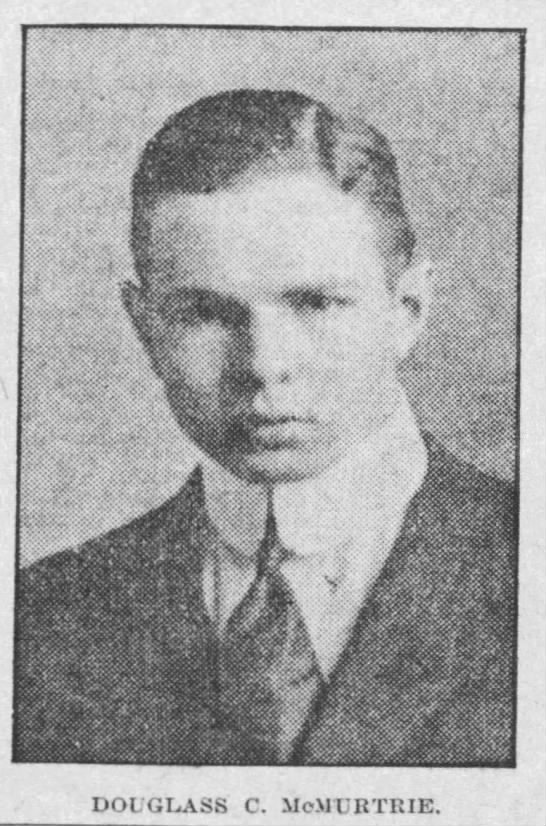
- Born: July 20, 1888
- Died: September 29, 1944 (aged 56)
- Alma mater: Massachusetts Institute of Technology
- Occupation: Graphic designer, bibliographer

Douglas Crawford McMurtrie (July 20, 1888 – September 29, 1944) was an American typeface designer, graphic designer, historian, author and bibliographer of printing.

== Early career ==
McMurtrie was born in Belmar, New Jersey and attended Massachusetts Institute of Technology. After leaving school without a degree, he worked as a newspaper reporter, statistician, free-lance designer, and printing broker. After several years, his design work came to the attention of Ingalls Kimball, who appointed McMurtrie general manager of the Cheltenham Press. He subsequently served as printing manager of the Columbia University Printing Office, the Arbor Press, and Condé Nast Press.

== Involvement with design and typography ==
During this period McMurtrie designed two type faces and helped design the format of the New Yorker magazine. He was instrumental in forming the Continental Type Founders Association, which imported types from Europe, serving as the company’s first vice-president. He also imported several faces from Europe on his own, including Cochin and Didot. During 1925/26, he succeeded Frederic Goudy as editor of the prestigious Ars Typographica magazine.

== Later career ==
After another period of free-lancing, McMurtrie moved to Chicago, where he spent a year as typographic director of the Cuneo Press before leaving to become director of advertising and typography at Ludlow Typograph Company. Though he designed one typeface for Ludlow, his duties there primarily consisted of writing advertising copy. He held this position until the end of his life.

Over the course of his career, he modernized the typography of over one hundred newspapers.

== Scholarly work ==
His scholarship focused on the development of print culture and the spread of print technologies in North America. Much of his work is concerned with the first established presses or newspapers, as well as the printing of "pioneers."

While at Ludlow, McMurtrie was allowed much time for research, resulting in many books, including one volume (of a planned four) of A History of Printing in the United States, and later The Book: the Story of Printing & Bookmaking, both of which won much acclaim.

Having established himself as one of the most important bibliographers of printing, McMurtrie was appointed to head up the Works Progress Administration’s American Imprints Inventory, (AII) a position he held until 1941. The AII was organized to locate and record books, pamphlets, and broadsides printed in the United States from the earliest times up to the date of Frederick Leypoldt's "United States Catalog," which began in 1876. This project resulted in thirty-five publications as well as more than fifteen million documents being deposited in the Library of Congress.

== Work with Charities for the Disabled ==
McMurtrie was much involved in charities for the disabled, He was appointed editor of the American Journal of Care for Cripples in 1912 and president of the Federation of Associations for Cripples from 1915 to 1919. He was particularly concerned with disabled soldiers after World War I helping to establish rehabilitation centers for returning soldiers. He worked with the Red Cross Institute for Crippled and Disabled Men.

== Personal life ==
McMurtrie was a large man, weighing over 300 pounds, and was known for his engaging personality. He married Adele Kohler in 1915 and they had three children. He died suddenly of a heart attack in Evanston, Illinois in 1944 at age 55.

== Typefaces ==
- McMurtrie Tile (1922, Continental), capitals only, based on an 18th-century Dutch face by Jacques François Rosart.
- Vanity Fair Tile (1923, privately cast by Continental for Condé Nast Press), capitals only, based on an 18th-century Dutch face by J.F. Rosart.
- Ultra-Modern series
  - Ultra-Modern Roman (1928, Ludlow), designed in collaboration with Aaron Borad and Leslie Sprunger.
  - Ultra-Modern bold (1930, Ludlow)
  - Ultra-Modern Medium Italic (1930, Ludlow)

== Books ==
- American type design in the twentieth century, with specimens of the outstanding types produced during this period, published by Robert O. Ballou, Chicago, 1924
- The History of Typefounding in the United States, privately printed, N.Y.C., 1925.
- Alphabets; a Manual of Letter Design. Pelham N.Y: Bridgman.(1926).
- The Golden Book; the story of fine books and bookmaking Pascal Covici Publishing Inc, N.Y.C., 1927.
- Type Design, Bridgeman Publishers, Pelham, New York, 1927.
- The Fichet Letter: the earliest document ascribing to Gutenberg the invention of printing, Press of Ars Typographica, N.Y.C., 1927.
- Modern Typography & Layout, Eyncourt Press, Chicago, 1929.
- Active-age Typography, Chicago, 1930.
- Concerning Quotations, New York, 1934
- A History of Printing in the United States: The Story of the Introduction of the Press and of Its History and Influence during the Pioneer Period in Each State of the Union,, in collaboration with Albert H. Allen, R.R. Bowker, N.Y.C., 1936.
- The Book: the Story of Printing & Bookmaking, Oxford University Press, N.Y.C., 1943.

== Selected Articles ==
- McMurtrie, Douglas C.(1931). “Pioneer Printing in Texas.” Southwestern historical quarterly 35.3: 173–193.
- McMurtrie, Douglas C. (1933) “The First Printers of Illinois.” Journal of the Illinois State Historical Society 26.3 (1933): 202–221.
- McMurtrie, Douglas C. “A Bibliography of South Carolina Imprints, 1731-1740.” South Carolina historical and genealogical magazine 34.3 (1933): 117–137.
- McMurtrie, Douglas C.(1936). “The Need of a Printer in Indiana Territory.” Indiana magazine of history 32.1 (1936): 34–37.
- McMurtrie, Douglas C.(1940). “A Coast-to-Coast Search for Early American Printing.” ALA Bulletin 34.8: 460–485.
- McMurtrie, Douglas C. (1944) "The Beginnings of Printing in Florida." Florida Historical Quarterly. 63-96. [Facsimile reprint, 1950, The Book Farm, New Braunfels, Texas.]

== Addresses ==
- McMurtrie, Douglass C. (1937). "The contribution of the pioneer printers to Illinois history; the address to the Illinois day meeting of the Illinois State Historical Society at Springfield, on December 3, 1937." Illinois State Historical Society.
