= Melbert B. Cary Jr. =

American artist (1892–1941)

Melbert Brinckerhoff Cary Jr. (1892–1941) was a graphic artist who imported numerous typefaces from Europe. He married Mary Flagler Cary, an heiress of one of the founders of Standard Oil. Mr Cary founded the Press of the Woolly Whale, a private press dedicated to producing fine editions of works Cary believed to be of interest and overlooked—a rejection of the private press tradition of producing only new editions of classic works. In his own words:

== Career ==
(Preface, The Vision of Sir Launfal (Press of the Woolly Whale, 1929)) He was also director of Continental Type Founders Association, which imported typeface from Europe, including Kabel and Eve typefaces. In the 1930s, Mr. Cary was instrumental in assisting Fritz Kredel's emigration from Germany to the United States.

Our intention [is] to publish only those text which appeal strongly to us, excluding those accepted classics, so completely accepted that they are never opened. Our interest lies only with those who read their books, cherishing them because of the enjoyment gained from using them.

During the 1920s and 1930s, Mr. Cary assembled a library of over 2,300 volumes about printing., Melbert Cary was also an avid collector of playing cards. The Woolly Whale press's most renowned publication was The Devil's Bible, which was a set of playing cards using caricatures of World War I figures. In 1967, Cary's widow, Mary Flagler Cary, donated the couple's card collection to Yale University, where it currently resides in the Beinecke Rare Book and Manuscript Library and is referred to as the Cary Collection of Playing Cards.

Woolly Whale also published The Missing Gutenberg Woodblocks, which was a made-up story of missing woodblocks from the Gutenberg project. Friz Kredel did some illustrations for this book, and some scholars took the book seriously.

His father, Melbert B. Cary, was the Democratic candidate for governor of Connecticut in 1902, and was the Chairman of the Democratic Party in Connecticut.

Cary, Jr. died of bone cancer in 1941.

The Cary Collection was presented to the Rochester Institute of Technology in 1969 by the Mary Flagler Cary Charitable Trust as a memorial to Melbert Cary. Its collection of 20,000 volumes is described as one of America's premier libraries on the history and practice of printing. The Cary Graphic Arts Collection has since grown to cover all aspects of graphic communication.
