= Hans Bohn =

German graphic artist and typographer (1891–1980)

- Born: December 23, 1891
- Died: May 10, 1980 (aged 88)
- Occupations: Graphic artist and typographer

Hans Bohn (December 23, 1891 – May 10, 1980) was a German graphic artist and typographer. He developed the fonts Orplid, Mondial, Allegro, and the heavier weight of Kuenstler Script.

After training at the Technische Lehranstalt in Offenbach, he began his professional career at the Ullstein Verlag in Berlin in 1914. From 1919 to 1930, he worked at the Klingspor Foundry. Afterwards he was a freelance graphic designer. He produced fonts and graphic arts for Ludwig & Mayer, a major German foundry, in the 1930s. In the 1950s, he produced the Kuenstler font for the Stempel foundry.

== See also ==
- Kuenstler Script
