= Allegro (typeface) =

Typeface

- Category: Display; Serif; Didone
- Designer(s): Hans Bohn
- Foundry: Ludwig & Mayer
- Date released: 1936

Allegro is a serif typeface intended for display use. It was designed by Hans Bohn for the Ludwig & Mayer type foundry of Frankfurt, and released in 1936.

Allegro is inspired by the Didone style dating from around the start of the nineteenth century onwards, that emphasised alternation of very thick and very thin strokes. However, it emphasises this through breaks in the letter where thin strokes would normally be found, producing an effect similar to stencilled lettering, with a slight inclination suggesting handwriting and ball terminals and swashes suggesting music. Allegro is particularly used for decorative purposes, such as on book jackets.

Allegro has been digitised and is sold by Bitstream. Its description of Allegro writes that it blends:

characteristics of roman and italic, fat face and stencil, modern and script.

== See also ==
- Samples of display typefaces
