= Max Salzmann =

German designer

- Known for: typography

Max Salzmann was a German designer at the Schelter & Giesecke Type Foundry. He immigrated to the United States.

== Fonts Designed ==
All of these faces were produced by the Schelter & Giesecke Type Foundry.

- Dolmen (1922) An art deco face. Digitized by Nick Curtis (Salzmann Deco NF, 2011). There are also versions of Dolmen by Linotype (1987), Letraset and ITC.
  - Zierdolmen (1922), a decorated version of Dolmen. Digitized by Nick Curtis (Salzmann Deco Deco NF, 2011).
- Kalender Vignetten (1907)
- Salzmann Antiqua (1913)
- Salzmann Fraktur + Kräftige Salzmann Fraktur (1912) A digital versions were made by Ralph M. Unger (Salzmann Fraktur, 2019), Delbanco (DS-Salzmann-Fraktur, 2001), and Chiron (TbC Salzmann Fraktur, 2012).
- Salzmann Kursiv (1911)
- Salzmannschrift + Salzmannschrift halbfette + schmale Salzmannschrift (1910)
