= Belwe Roman =

Typeface

Belwe
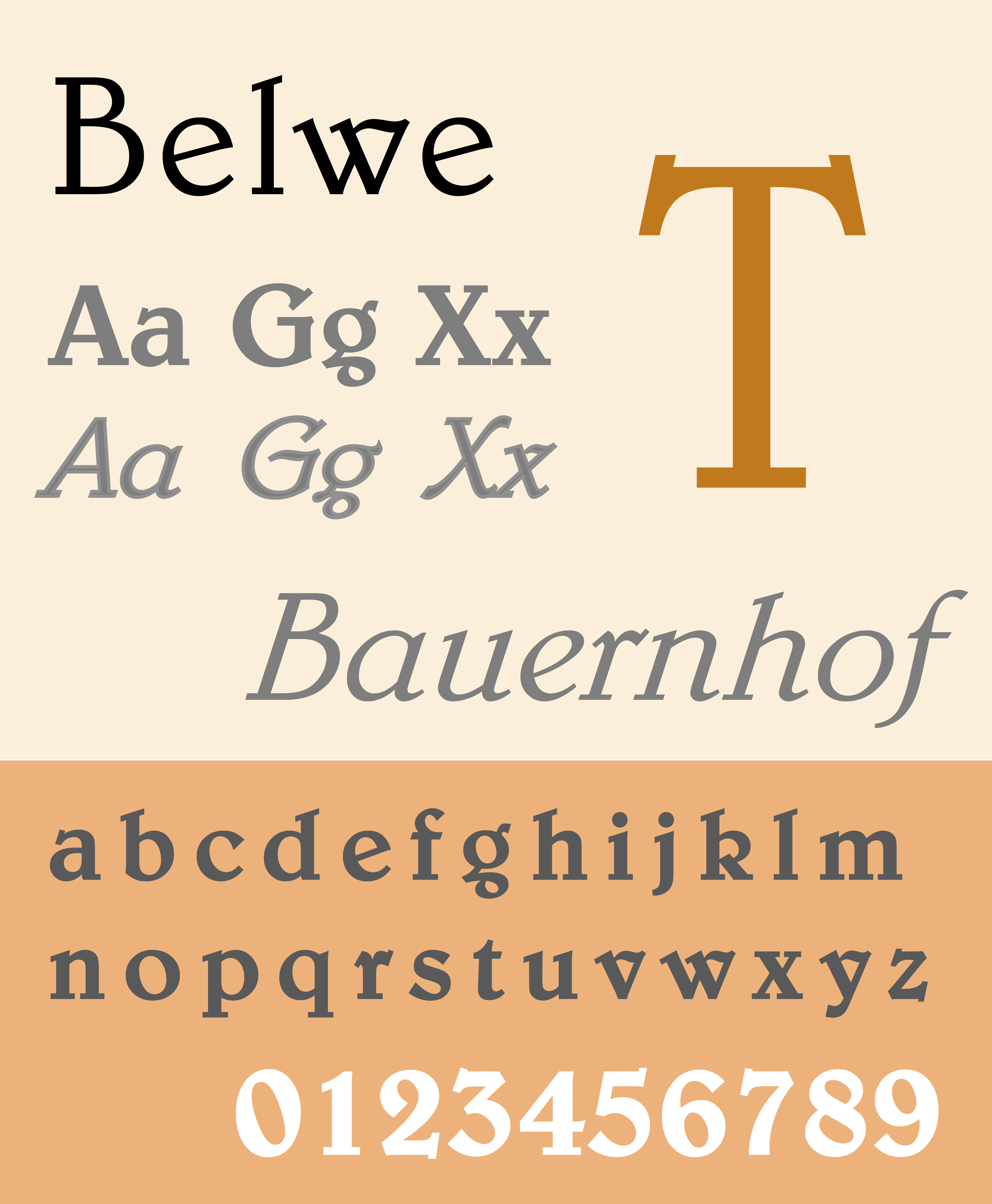
- Category: Serif
- Classification: Display
- Designer(s): Georg Belwe
- Foundry: J.G. Schelter & Giesecke
- Date released: 1907

Belwe Roman is a display typeface designed by Georg Belwe in 1907. The type has Old Style qualities, but short ascenders and very short descenders as well as calligraphic and Fraktur influences.

== Foundry Type ==
Belwe Roman was originally cast by the Schelter & Giesecke Type Foundry in text, medium bold, and bold weights. An inline version was cast as well.

== Cold Type Copies ==
Belwe Roman was revived in Cold Type versions by Compugraphic as Belwe. It was popular enough for all four original weights and styles to be reissued.

== Digital Copies ==
A digital version, also simply called Belwe, was released in 1989 by ITC. Another version, Belwe EF, is made by Elsner+Flake.

== Usage ==
- Used in the video game Hearthstone, as a UI and card name typeface.
- Used in logos of the next two video games: Sonic Drift and Sonic Drift 2, as a subtitle.
- Used in the logo of the outdoor clothing and equipment manufacturer Patagonia, Inc.
- Used by the Jubilee Foods grocery chain
