= Cary Collection of Playing Cards =

Coordinates: 41.3116°N 72.9273°W

Playing card (fused Jack of Spades and November Hikari) from the Beinecke Rare Book & Manuscript Library, Yale University.

The Cary Collection of Playing Cards, held at the Beinecke Rare Book & Manuscript Library of Yale University in the United States, is one of the most significant assemblages of materials relating to playing cards and related ephemera in North America.

== Overview ==
The collection is comparable to card collections held by the United States Playing Card Company, the Bibliothèque nationale de France, the Deutsches Spielkarten Museum, and the British Museum. The collection lays claim to more than 2600 decks of cards, 460 sheets of uncut card papers, and 150 wood blocks for printing cards.

Included in the collection are cards from all over the world, including Italy, Germany, Korea, and Iran. In addition to the card collections themselves, other ephemera related to the act of playing card games also belong to the collection, including various rulebooks and a variety of gaming counters. The true value of the collection lies in the wisdom of its principal collector, who desired to amass a collection that reflected in some depth both standard and non-standard cards. As a result, the Cary Collection has close to, if not the, greatest variety of both types of cards.

== History of the collection ==
Although the card collection is named after Melbert B. Cary Jr., a wealthy importer, the collection actually began in 1945 with the donation of a sizeable number of cards and books from Mrs Samuel H. Fisher. Her donations were significant, spanning approximately five hundred years of the history of the playing card and reaching as far back as the 15th century. Despite Mrs Fisher's initial donation, the collection did not gain its current reputation as a premier collection until the late 1960s, when Cary's widow, Mary Flagler Cary, donated the couple's collection to Yale. Since then, the collection has continued to grow due to a generous bequest that accompanied the Cary's donation and that stipulates that the money can only be used for the purchase of playing cards and related materials.

== Tarot and fortune-telling cards ==
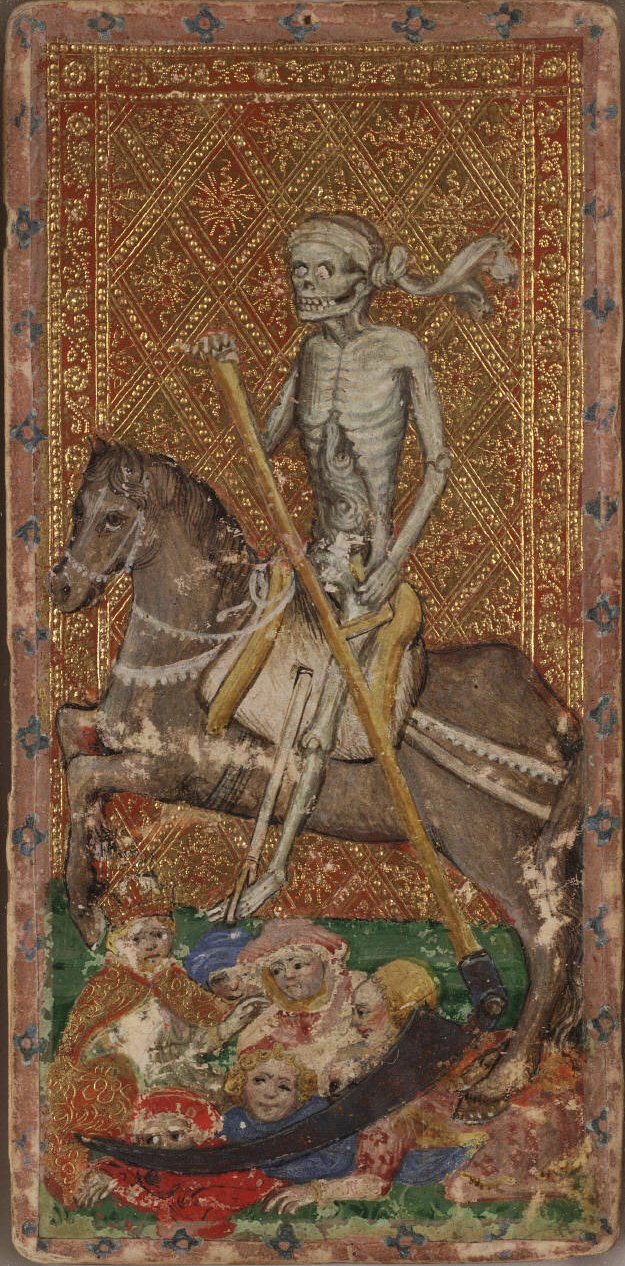
Tarot card (Death) from the Beinecke Rare Book & Manuscript Library, Yale University.

The Cary Collection is not merely composed of standard playing cards, but also contains tarot cards as well as cards related to cartomancy, or the divination of one's fortune based upon interpretation of various cards. The Beinecke Library guards two of the earliest still-existing tarot decks in the world, the Visconti and the Este tarot cards. Of the two, the Visconti cards are probably the best known. These cards were commissioned by the Visconti family in the mid-15th century and may be the oldest tarot card deck still in existence.

The Visconti and Este tarot cards are not the only such cards in the Cary Collection. There are also French-suited animal tarots from Belgium and some Marseille-type tarots. Also included are non-tarot cartomantic decks. In 2006, the Beinecke acquired a pack of cards that were enclosed in every packet of Black Cat Virginia cigarettes, and in 2007 a deck of seventy-eight photographic tarot cards was added to the collection.
