= Rick Cusick =

American designer

Rick Cusick is an American lettering artist, calligrapher, type designer and book designer.

== Career ==
Cusick began his lettering career designing illuminated signs for Ad/Art, Inc. in his hometown of Stockton, California, followed by study at Art Center College of Design in Los Angeles, where lettering artist Mortimer Leach was among his teachers. Since 1971, he has worked in lettering and typographic design and as a book designer for Hallmark Cards, in Kansas City, Missouri. He has designed books, journals, posters, brochures, packaging, logos, cards, giftwrap and fonts. As a lettering studio manager, his duties include overseeing font development. He has designed several proprietary typefaces for Hallmark that are used on a range of products, such as greeting cards, books, films and packaging.

Cusick also freelances calligraphy, lettering and design projects and has done a wide variety of work, from Las Vegas signage to a 17 ft (5.2 m) long biblical quotation for the Community of Christ's headquarters, Independence Temple, designed by the renowned architect, Gyo Obata.

Nyx is an Adobe Original stencil font created by Cusick and released by Adobe Systems in 1997. It is named after Cusick's muse, Nyx, the Greek goddess of night.

From 1984 to 1990, Cusick taught typography and publication design at the University of Kansas. He has taught numerous workshops worldwide, including a five-day workshop for the Schreibwerkstatt in Offenbach, Germany. He has lectured at Kansas City Art Institute, Indiana Central University, Art Directors Club of El Paso, New York Society of Scribes, Los Angeles Society for Calligraphy, TypeCon 2003 and more.

Cusick has judged numerous lettering and type contests, including TDC2, 2005 type design contest.

== Publications ==
Cusick has compiled, edited and designed numerous books including two books about prominent twentieth century American calligraphers: With Respect ... To RFD, an appreciation of Raymond F. DaBoll; and Straight Impressions, essays and calligraphy by Lloyd Reynolds. The Proverbial Bestiary, features proverbs hand-lettered by Cusick and paired with drawings by the late Warren Chappell, which was a Book of the Month Club bonus selection. Cusick was art director of Letter Arts Review from 1992 -2003. He has designed numerous books for various publishers, including Andrews & McMeel, American Century, Harrow Books and City of Fountain Foundation.

His work has appeared in numerous books and periodicals including: Communication Arts, Typography 6, Calligraphy Today, Typography 18, Visible Language, Signs of the Times, Alphabet, International Calligraphy Today, Fine Print, and Letter Arts Review. He has written articles for Fine Print, Calligraphy Review, Alphabet, ABC-XYZapf, and Calligraphic Type Design in the Digital Age.

Cusick is proprietor of Nyx Editions, which has created a range of books and pamphlets regarding the lettering arts including OK, It's All Yours: Recollections of Arnold Bank, and Type Fa*ce*tious: Earth-shattering quotations featuring the font designs of Jill Bell.

What Our Lettering Needs: The Contribution of Hermann Zapf to Calligraphy & Type Design at Hallmark Cards written and designed by Cusick, is a thorough account of Hermann Zapf’s contributions to the artistry and success of Hallmark Cards. This beautifully illustrated book, published by RIT Cary Graphic Arts Press in December, 2011, is a tribute to Zapf’s own philosophy that the artist’s challenge is “to ensure, despite technology and mass production, that beauty is never lost.”

== Exhibitions ==
Cusick's work has appeared in numerous group shows in museums and galleries worldwide, including New York, San Francisco, Los Angeles, Dallas, London, New Delhi, Offenbach, Tallinn and Moscow.

One-Man Shows

- 1987 Miscellanea: Lettering and Graphic Design by Rick Cusick. Appleman Gallery, London
- 1991 TLC: Typography/Lettering/Calligraphy. Mettier Gallery, Weston, Missouri
- 1995 Quiet Passion, A 25-year retrospective of design, lettering and calligraphy. San Francisco Public Library Special Collections Department. Exhibit traveled to Wichita State University, the Hallmark Creative Resource Gallery and to Columbus College of Art and Design.
