= Paul Sinkwitz =

German painter

- Born: 29 March 1899; Lausitz, Germany
- Died: 15 July 1981 (aged 82); Bad Tölz, Germany
- Occupation: Painter

Paul Sinkwitz (29 March 1899 – 15 July 1981) was a German painter and type designer. His work was part of the painting event in the art competition at the 1936 Summer Olympics.

== Fonts designed by Paul Sinkwitz ==
- Sinkwitz-Gotisch (1942, Schriftguss Type Foundry)
