= VEB Typoart =

State-owned type foundry of East Germany (1948–95)

- Type: Volkseigener Betrieb
- Industry: Type foundry
- Predecessor: Schelter & Giesecke, Ludwig Wagner AG, Schriftguss AG
- Founded: 1948
- Defunct: 1995
- Headquarters: Dresden, Germany

VEB Typoart was the only type foundry of East Germany. It was a state-owned enterprise ("Volkseigener Betrieb") located in Dresden. The foundry's most influential art directors were Herbert Thannhäuser (until 1963) and Albert Kapr (until 1987).

== History ==
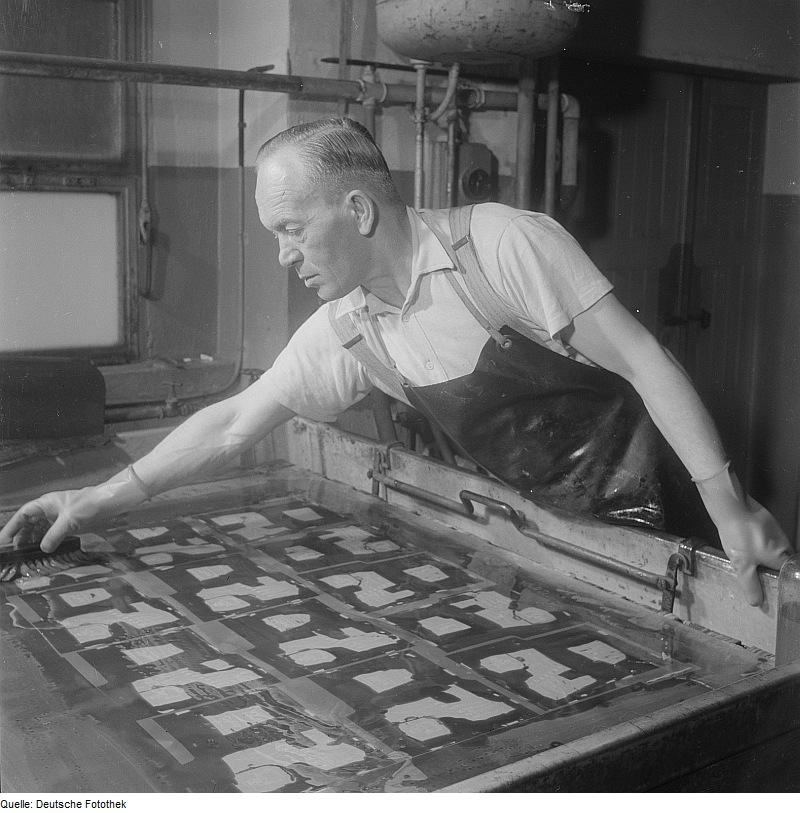
Worker at VEB Typoart

VEB Typoart was created by the government of the German Democratic Republic in 1948 through a merger of several nationalised type foundries, including Schelter & Giesecke (1945), Schriftguss AG (1951), Ludwig Wagner AG (1961), and Norddeutsche Schriftgießerei (1961). Originally called Schriftguß KG Dresden (1945) and VEB Schriftguß Dresden (1958), the enterprise was renamed to VEB Typoart in 1951.

From 1970, it was subordinated to Zentrag, a state enterprise coordinating all GDR printing activity. Typoart's principal mission was to create typefaces for Eastern Germany and other Eastern Bloc countries. It was frequently ordered to plagiarise Western typefaces that Zentrag could not afford to license.

In the course of German reunification, Typoart was privatised as Typoart GmbH in 1990 and went bankrupt in 1995 after a negotiated sale to Compugraphic fell through. Many of Typoart's fonts and other works were lost at this time, including original matrices of Tschichold's type Saskia, although employees managed to save some matrices, original drawings and digital data. After this, the copyright status of Typoart's typefaces remained uncertain. Some have been reissued in digital form by other type foundries, mostly by Elsner & Flake. Some of Typoart's matrices are preserved at the Museum für Druckkunst Leipzig.

== Typefaces ==
Typoart's typefaces included:

- Biga (1985, Fritz Richter)
- Demeter (P. A. Demeter), originally cast by Schriftguss.
- Faust-Antiqua (1959, Albert Kapr)
- Fleischmann (1927, Georg Belwe), originally cast by Wagner Foundry.
- Fornier (1922, P. A. Demeter)
- Freundschaft (1962, Lin Yu-Bingnan)
- Garamond, based on the ATF design of 1917.
- Leipziger Antiqua (Albert Kapr)
- Magna Kyrillisch (Albert Kapr)
- Maxima (Gert Wunderlich)
- Minima (Karl-Heinz Lange)
- Mimosa, a knock-off of Copperplate Gothic, originally cast by Weber.
- Neutra (Albert Kapr)
- Prillwitz Antiqua (Albert Kapr)
- Publica (Karl-Heinz Lange)
- Supra (Karl-Heinz Lange)
- Super Grotesk (Arno Drescher), later digitized as FF Super Grotesk and Bitstream Drescher Grotesk
- Stentor (Heinz Schumann)
