= Warren Chappell =

American illustrator and writer (1904–1991)

- Born: 1904; Richmond, Virginia, U.S.
- Died: March 26, 1991 (aged 86–87); Charlottesville, Virginia, U.S.
- Occupations: Illustrator; type designer; writer
- Known for: designer of Lydian Series
- Spouse: Lydia Hatfield

Warren Chappell (1904 – March 26, 1991) was an American illustrator, book and type designer, and writer.

== Early life ==
Warren Chappell was born in 1904 in Richmond, Virginia. He drew and modeled with clay at a young age. According to his obituary, at the age of 11, magazine drawings by Boardman Robinson led him to become an artist.

He was a graduate of the University of Richmond, and then studied at the Art Students League of New York, under Boardman Robinson, where he later taught. In 1931-2 he studied type design and punch-cutting under Rudolf Koch at the Design School Offenbach in Germany. In 1935 he studied illustration at the Colorado Springs Fine Arts Center. The University of Richmond awarded him an honorary D.F.A. in 1968. In 1970 his work in the graphic arts was recognized by the Rochester Institute of Technology, with the presentation of their Goudy Award.

== Career ==
After running his studio in New York City for several years, Chappell traveled to Germany just before World War II to work at Stempel on the typeface Trajanus. He returned to the United States at the onset of the war, having seen only initial proofs. He first saw the completed typeface in Swedish design magazines during the war. He later devoted himself to book design and illustration and was closely associated with the firm of Alfred A. Knopf for which he designed many books. He also did illustrations for Random House, Harper & Row, and Doubleday. He was a typography consultant to both the Book of the Month Club and American Type Founders. He was Artist-in-Residence at the University of Virginia in Charlottesville. He had a studio in the library stacks.

John Updike and Chappell worked together on books for children on music, including "The Magic Flute" (1962), "The Ring" (1964) and "Bottom's Dream" (1969). His design for the E. P. Dutton re-issues of A. A. Milne's Winnie-the-Pooh books are considered to be particularly elegant. Towards the end of his life, he donated books on design to the University of Virginia. After the death of his friend Charles Locke, he organized the Charles Locke Fund at the University of Virginia.

== Typefaces ==
- Koch Uncial (1932) in collaboration with Paul Koch
- Lydian Series (ATF)
  - Lydian + Italic (1938)
  - Lydian Bold + Italic (1938)
  - Lydian Cursive (1940)
  - Lydian Condensed + Italic (1946)
- Trajanus Antiqua (roman) + Trajanus Kursiv (italic) + Trajanus Halbfett (semi-bold) (1939, Stempel + Linotype (Frankfurt)), named for the same Roman emperor as Carol Twombly's Trajan but a very different design, being a Medieval. See Fr. Edward Catich's research for more on the origin of the monumental lettering style which was the inspiration for the typeface Trajan. The semi-bold weight however, was prepared by the foundry, Chappell having only made drawings (starting with a broad nibbed pen, then refining the contours using opaque white as if using a graver) for the roman and italic designs. The Huxley House specimen book for it was featured in a 1952 AIGA design annual.

Chappell's book The Living Alphabet (1975) was set entirely in Trajanus by Finn Typographic of Stamford Connecticut.

== Personal life ==
Chappell married Lydia Hatfield. He named the Lydian typeface after his wife Lydia.

Chappell moved to Charlottesville, Virginia, in 1978. He died on March 26, 1991, at his home in Charlottesville.

== Bibliography ==
Books written by Chappell:

- The Anatomy of Lettering (1934)
- A Short History of the Printed Word (1970; a revised edition was published in 2000)
- The Living Alphabet (on calligraphy, 1975)
- The Proverbial Bestiary with Rick Cusick (1982)

Illustrated children's books:

- A Tale of a Tub by Swift, (1930)
- The Nutcracker (1958)
- They Say Stories (1960)
- Sleeping Beauty (1961)
- Moby-Dick W. W. Norton & Co. (1967).

Illustrated adult books:

- The Complete Novels of Jane Austin Random House, (1950)
