= Lydian (typeface) =

Humanist typeface

- Category: Calligraphic, humanist, sans-serif
- Designer: Warren Chappell
- Foundry: ATF
- Date created: 1938–1946

Lydian is a calligraphic humanist sans-serif typeface designed by Warren Chappell for American Type Founders in 1938. It is available in bold, italic, and condensed, as well as in a Cursive variant. The original foundry font was commissioned and cast by American Type Founders, and included a stylistic alternate, a capital ‹A› with a cross bar. It was named after the designer's wife Lydia. It is famously used as the font for the end credits on the TV show Friends.

The various members of the family were introduced over the course of eight years:

- Lydian Italic (1938)
- Lydian Bold Italic (1938)
- Lydian Cursive (1940)
- Lydian Condensed Italic (1946)
