= Carlos Winkow =

German type designer

- Born: 6 February 1882; Sömmerda, Germany
- Died: 16 January 1952 (aged 69)
- Known for: typography
- Notable work: Reporter

Carl Winckow known in Spain, where he spent most of his working life, as Carlos Winkow (6 February 1882 – 16 January 1952) was a German type designer who worked primarily for the Nacional Typefoundry.

== Fonts Designed by Carlos Winkow ==
- Elzeviriano Ibarra (1931, Gans Typefoundry), digitized in 2011 by Lucia Walter.
- Reporter, (1938, L. Wagner Type Foundry), reissued as Cursiva Rusinol by Nacional
- Electra, (c. 1940, Nacional), digitized by Font Bureau as Romeo.
- Nacional, (1941, Nacional)
- Iberica, (1942, Nacional), digitized in 1997 by Pat Hickson as Roller.
- Alcazar, (1944, Nacional)
- Gong, (1945, L. Wagner Type Foundry)

== Notes ==
- Jaspert, W. Pincus, W. Turner Berry and A.F. Johnson. The Encyclopedia of Type Faces. Blandford Press Lts.: 1953, 1983. ISBN 0-7137-1347-X.
- Font Designer - Carlos Winkow
- MyFonts – Carlos Winkow
