= L. Wagner Type Foundry =

Ludwig Wagner AG
- Industry: Type foundry
- Founded: 1902
- Founder: Ludwig Wagner
- Defunct: 1960
- Headquarters: Leipzig, Germany
- Key people: Georg Belwe, Carlos Winkow

The Ludwig Wagner Type Foundry was established in 1902 in Leipzig after the veteran punch cutter Ludwig Wagner took over the small foundry Gundelach & Ebersbach in 1901. The beginning of his modern type production and the extension of his business happened before 1914. The large manufacturing facilities in East Leipzig suffered extensive bomb damage during World War II. In 1949, the company was given new facilities in the Southwestern part of Leipzig. Ludwig Wagner AG was incorporated into Typoart by the East German government in 1960 and Wagner himself moved to the German Federal Republic.

== Typefaces ==
These foundry types were produced by the Wagner Type Foundryr:

- Acropolis (1940)
- Electra, (Carlos Winkow), digitized by Font Bureau as Romeo
- Fleischmann (1927, Georg Belwe), based on the eighteenth century designs of Joan Michaël Fleischman
- Florenz, (1960, Paul Zimmermann)
- Gong, (1945, Carlos Winkow)
- Industrie Antiqua, also sold by Linotype (Frankfurt).
- Reporter, (1938, Carlos Winkow), reissued as Cursiva Rusinol by Naçional
