= Birgitta Kumlien-Nyheim =

Birgitta Kumlien-Nyheim (born 1942) is a Swedish-born Norwegian artist and abstract painter. Her works have been exhibited in Europe and North America.

== Personal life and education ==
Birgitta Kumlien-Nyheim was born in Sweden, but grew up in Rome, Italy. She received a Bachelor of Arts in modern languages at the Stockholm University, a diploma at L'Accademia delle Belle Arti in Rome, and a degree at the University of Oslo in Art history. In her adult life she lived in Japan, Norway, Italy, Spain and Canada. She married Jan Edmund Nyheim, a Norwegian ambassador.

== Selected solo exhibitions ==
- 1987: Oslo Kunstforening, Oslo
- 1990: La Galerie Rodrigue Le May, Ottawa
- 1993: Palazzo Ruspoli, Rome
- 1996: Ormond Gallery, Dublin
- 1997: Clockworthy Art Centre, Belfast
- 1999: Galeria Edurne, Madrid
- 2001: Fundacion Colegio del Rey, Casa de la Entrevista, Alkala' de Henares, Madrid
- 2002, 2004, 2006 and 2009: Galleri Kampen, Oslo
- 2006: Christianssands Kunstforening, Kristiansand
- 2007: Hurum Kunstlag, Holmsbu
