= Gudrun Zapf von Hesse =

German typographer (1918–2019)

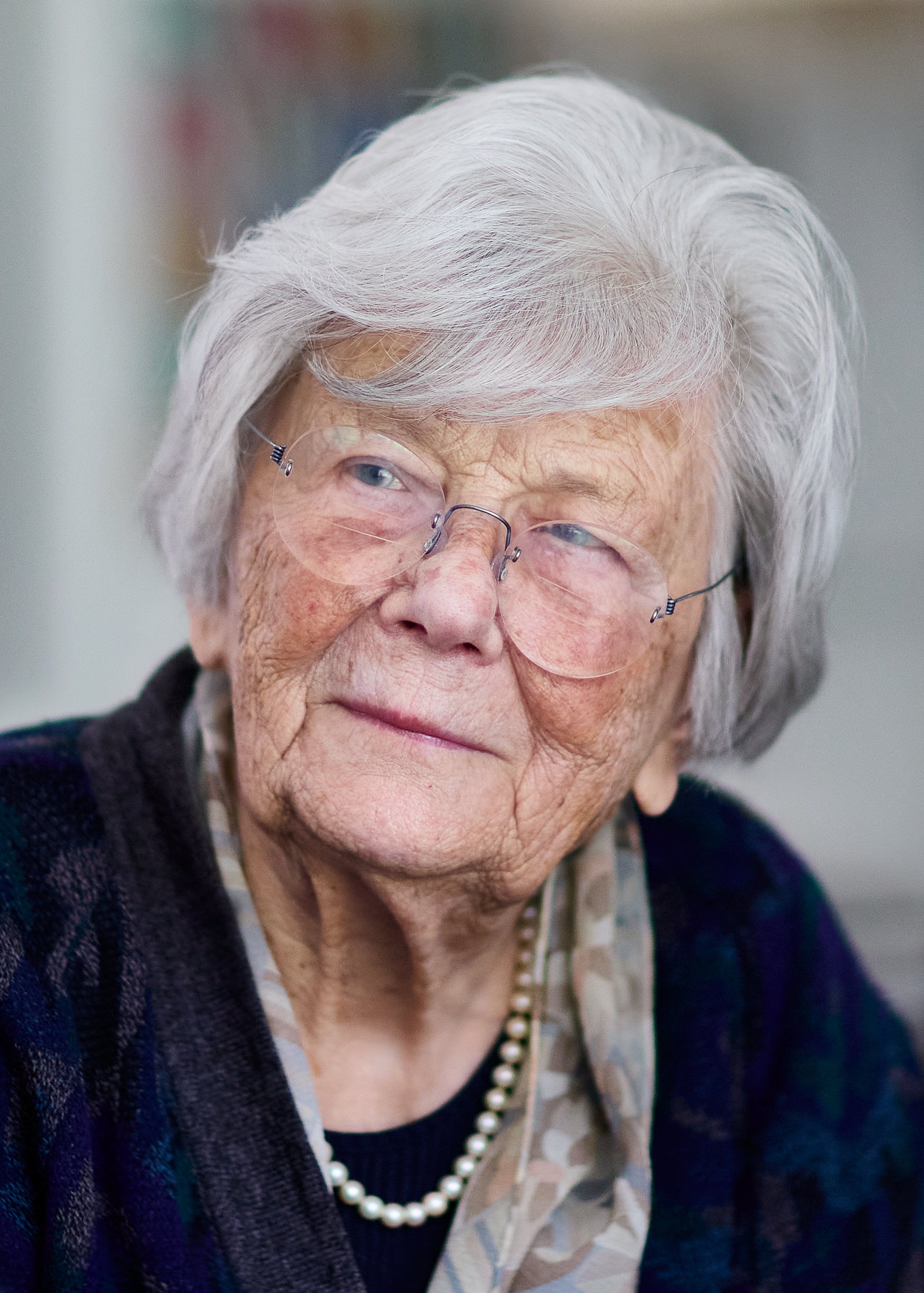
- Zapf von Hesse in 2016
- Born: Gudrun von Hesse; 2 January 1918; Schwerin, Germany
- Died: 13 December 2019 (aged 101); Darmstadt, Germany
- Occupations: Bookbinder and Typographer
- Years active: 1951–1990s
- Notable work: Diotima
- Spouse: Hermann Zapf (m. 1951; died 2015)
- Children: 1

Gudrun Zapf von Hesse (2 January 1918 – 13 December 2019) was a German book-binder, calligrapher and typographer.

She also designed several typefaces. She was the 1991 winner of the Frederic W. Goudy Award. To mark her hundredth birthday in January 2018, Monotype released the titling typeface Hesse Antiqua.

== Early life and education ==
Gudrun von Hesse was born on 2 January 1918 in Schwerin, Mecklenburg-Schwerin (then part of German Empire).

She became an apprentice and assistant at the bookbindery of Otto Dorfner in Weimar from 1934 to 1937. Her calligraphy practice began during this apprenticeship; in her acceptance address for the Frederic W. Goudy Award, she said "One afternoon a week we had to write very simple letters. I was not satisfied with this form of instruction; therefore, I taught myself at home, from a detailed examination of the works of Rudolf Koch and Edward Johnston."

After completing her apprenticeship in 1937, Zapf von Hesse stayed on as an assistant in Dorfner's bindery until 1940. She received a Master's Diploma in bookbinding in 1940. She completed further studies at the Berlin Graphic Arts School in 1941 with Johannes Boehland (German painter and graphic artist, 1903–1964).

== Personal life ==
Zapf von Hesse moved from her home in Potsdam to Frankfurt in late 1945 or 1946. Potsdam was under the Soviet occupation after World War II, and according to Zapf von Hesse it was "not a good place at all to start a new life". She met Hermann Zapf in 1948. Zapf was the art director for D. Stempel AG type foundry. She was invited to visit Stempel's offices after Zapf and Dr. Lepold (Stempel's director) had seen her letterforms at an exhibition in Frankfurt. She and Zapf married on 1 August 1951, and the two managed thereafter to keep their professional work somewhat separate.

Zapf von Hesse and Hermann Zapf had a son, Christian (1955–2012). During her acceptance address for the Frederic W. Goudy award, she commented that she was "a little sorry" about not having time to do bookbinding when her son was young. After some years passed, however, she was able to focus on calligraphy and type design. Zapf von Hesse died in December 2019 at the age of 101.

== Career ==
In 1941, Zapf von Hesse worked as a bookbinder in Berlin. From 1944 to 1945, she taught bookbinding and calligraphy as therapy for soldiers with head injuries at a hospital in Bad Ischl, Austria. After World War II, in 1946, she opened her own book bindery on the premises of the Bauer type foundry in Frankfurt. The director of the foundry, Georg Hartmann, gave her permission to operate her bindery on the premises.

While working at Bauer in the late 1940s, Zapf von Hesse learned punchcutting and cut her first complete brass alphabet, Hesse Antiqua, under the guidance of Bauer's chief punchcutter, Joseph Spahn. The alphabet was made specifically for gold-tooling on book bindings. The titling face was digitized in 2018 by Ferdinand Ulrich. She also made decorating tools with Spahn's help.

From 1946 to 1954, Zapf von Hesse taught calligraphy at the Städelschule in Frankfurt. At a calligraphy exhibit in Frankfurt, Gunther Lepold, the director of D. Stempel AG Type Foundry, and Hermann Zapf, Stempel's art director, took notice of her work and invited her to Stempel for a meeting.

Zapf von Hesse's career as a type designer began after Lepold and Zapf commissioned her to design typefaces for Stempel. Her first typeface for Stempel was Diotima, issued in 1951. The New York City Opera used Diotima for advertisements in the New York Times, and it was also used for headings in the British Airways in-flight magazine.

In 1948, Zapf von Hesse opened a bookbinding studio with one apprentice in the Stempel Type Foundry building. Her bindery at Stempel closed in 1955 when her son Christian Ludwig was born, but she continued designing typefaces "as time and family duties allowed."

In the 1970s, Zapf von Hesse worked with her husband Hermann Zapf to prepare bitmaps by hand for his alphabet designs Marconi and Edison. As technologies changed in the second half of the 20th century, she continued to design typefaces for photocomposition and digital production. She was actively designing typefaces into the 1990s for Berthold, Bitstream, and URW Hamburg.

== Style and technique ==
In general, Zapf von Hesse's work has "elegant simplicity" and "technical precision". Her use of decoration is "refined by moderation… both understated and unpretentious". For bookbinding technique, she utilized "the flexible method with thin boards and very small borders", which was contrary to the method she was taught during her apprenticeship. After receiving her Master's Diploma in bookbinding, she developed a style "simple and pure in decoration, carefully executed in every detail". Her speciality was the flexible binding. Her binding style differentiated itself from both traditional and avant-garde binding styles by being "fresh and modern".

For typefaces, Zapf von Hesse's foundation is calligraphy. The influence of calligraphy is noticeable in her typefaces Diotima and Columbine. In her acceptance speech for the 1991 Frederic Goudy Award, she stated, "In my opinion, the best foundation for creating new alphabets is an intensive study of calligraphy". Her calligraphic art ranges from "elegant traditional hands to free lettering with pen or brush, bordering on the abstract… [she also carries out] blackletter, italic, roman, majuscules, roman miniscules, and experimental lettering". The most comprehensive collection of examples of Gudrun Zapf von Hesse's artistic work is the book Gudrun Zapf von Hesse: Bindings, Handwritten Books, Type Faces, Examples of Lettering and Drawing published by Mark Batty in 2002.

== Impact and recognition ==
"While not as widely known as that of her prolific husband, [Zapf von Hesse's] work is also beautiful and typographically vital, and her career has also been long and productive. And speaking as a woman who has worked for years in a male-dominated type industry, Gudrun Zapf von Hesse's example has given me much inspiration and faith that good work is worth doing". – Linnea Lundquist

In 1991, Zapf von Hesse was the second woman to receive the prestigious Frederic W. Goudy award, an award "given to an outstanding practitioner in the field of typography", given by the Rochester Institute of Technology, Rochester, New York. In 2001, she was recognized with a Lifetime Achievement Award from the Friends of Calligraphy.

Zapf von Hesse's typeface Diotima italic has been called "one of the finest italic types ever" and a "perfect masterpiece." Zapf von Hesse and her husband Herman lent support to the Cary Graphic Arts Collection at the Rochester Institute of Technology, which houses a large collection of their materials. In 2008, the book Manuele Zapficum: Typographic Arrangements of the Words by and About the Work of Hermann Zapf & Gudrun Zapf von Hesse was published in honor of their ninetieth birthdays.

The documentary "Alphabet Magic" about the life and work of Gudrun Zapf von Hesse and Herman Zapf, conceived and produced by her niece professor Alexa Albrand and Directed by Marita Neher was shown shortly before her death in Germany, with Zapf von Hesse in attendance. The documentary was also shown at the Zapf Centennial celebrations which included an exhibit of her life and work and the Zapf Centennial Symposium at The Grolier Club in New York City.

== Exhibitions ==
- 2019: "Alfabetos Magicos: Cien Anos Con Hermann & Gudrun Zapf." ("Magic Alphabets: 100 Years With Hermann and Gudrun Zapf.") Escola Llotja Sant Andreu (Spain).
- 2019. "Alphabet Magic: A Centennial Exhibition of the Work of Hermann & Gudrun Zapf. Curated by Jerry Kelly." Grolier Club (New York).
- 2007: Melbert B. Cary, Jr. Graphic Art Collection, Rochester Institute of Technology (for which the book Spend Your Alphabets Lavishly was published)
- 2001: Skylight Gallery of the San Francisco Public Library (for which the book Calligraphic Type Design in the Digital Age: An Exhibition in Honor of the Contributions of Hermann and Gudrun Zapf was published)
- 1998: Hessische Landes– und Hochschulbibliothek (Darmstadt)
- 1991: Rochester Institute of Technology (Rochester)
- 1985: ITC-Center of the International Typeface Corporation (New York)
- 1970: Klingspor Museum (Offenbach am Main)
- 1952: Grafiska Institutet (Stockholm)

== Typeface designs ==
Images of Zapf von Hesse's typefaces are available from the Klingspor Museum's Online Font Library. Reference for the categorization of typefaces is Jerry Kelly's review in Letter Arts Review.

=== Metal ===
- Diotima Roman (Stempel – 1951): Diotima was modelled from Zapf von Hesse's calligraphy used for her handlettered version of From the Hyperion by Friedrich Holderlin. Gunther Lepold, the director of D. Stempel AG Type Foundry, and Hermann Zapf, Stempel's art director, saw this calligraphy at the Stadel Art School exhibit in 1948, which caused them to invite Zapf von Hesse to Stempel and thus began her type design career. Diotima was punchcut by August Rosenberger. Diotima was redesigned for photocomposition by Linotype/Stempel and Berthold; Zapf von Hesse was not consulted for this redesign and felt "there was a big loss in appearance of this Diotima version in comparison to the original letterpress type". Diotima was named after a Greek priestess in Plato's dialogue about love.
- Diotima Italic (Stempel – 1953)
- Ariadne Initials (Stempel – 1953)
- Smaragd (Emerald) (Stempel – 1954)

=== Photocomposition ===
- Shakespeare (Hallmark – 1968): Zapf von Hesse received a private commission from Hallmark Cards, resulting in her Shakespeare typeface, used for a 1968 Hallmark publication of Shakespeare’s Sonnets.

=== Digital ===
- Nofret (Berthold – 1987): Nofret was named after the Egyptian queen Nefertiti, and was released by Berthold in 1987. Nofret was used to print Alex Osborne'sYour Creative Power. The Fachhochschule Hamburg used Nofret as its house typeface.
- Carmina (Bitstream – 1987)
- Columbine (URW Hamburg – 1991)
- Christiana (Berthold – 1991)
- Alcuin (URW Hamburg – 1992): The typeface, Alcuin, was inspired by the advisor to Charlemagne and his Carolingian minuscule.
- Hesse Antiqua (2018, Monotype, with Ferdinand Ulrich)

== See also ==
- List of type designers
- Bookbinding
- Calligraphy
