= Stevens, Shanks & Sons Ltd. =

English type foundry

- Type: Ltd.
- Industry: Type foundry
- Founded: June 1933
- Defunct: 1984
- Headquarters: Southwark, London

Stevens, Shanks & Sons Ltd. was an English type foundry formed in 1933 by the merger of the Figgins Foundry with P. M. Shanks (Patent Type Foundry) to form Stevens, Shanks. Sometime after 1971 the foundry ceased operations and all materials (including Figgins' punches and matrices) went to St. Bride's Printing Library.

== Figgins Foundry ==
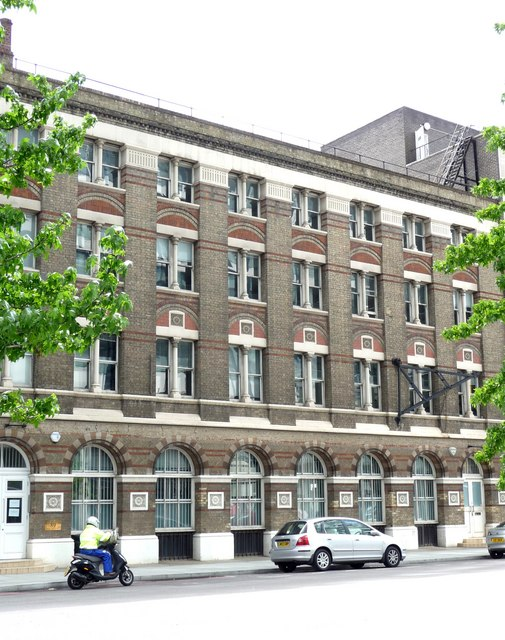
Stevens, Shanks & Sons was based in this building, now listed, at 89 Southwark Street.

Vincent Figgins was an apprentice at Jackson's Foundry, but unable to purchase that foundry at Jackson's death. He therefore started his own firm in 1792. The term sans-serif was first employed in 1830 by the Figgins foundry. The founder's great-grandson, Richard Herbert Stevens, arranged the merger with Shanks.

Stevens Shanks went into voluntary liquidation in December 1949 and the viable type-founding assets were purchased by A R Gibbon Ltd, a manufacturer of printing inks. The ink-maker restructured the typefoundry, moving casting equipment, punches and matrices from Southwark Street c.1971 to their headquarters at Coleman Fields in north London, where the foundry continued to operate until c.1984, although very little type was produced towards the end of the company's existence. In 1950, as the original company was being wound up, some machinery, punches and matrices were also purchased by Stephenson Blake, including the popular "Mercury" series of types.

It would appear from records held at Companies House that Stevens Shanks, remained on the register of active companies until 2006 when the business was finally wound-up.

== Patent Type Foundry ==
The foundry was started 1855 by John Huffam King. It was sold 1857 and renamed Patent Type-Founding Company. The foundry purchased a Johnson automatic typecasting machine in 1873. Known as P.M. Shanks & Co. from 1881 and finally as P.M. Shanks and Sons, Ltd. until its merger with Stevens.

== Typefaces ==
These foundry types were produced by Stevens, Shanks:

- Bessemer (1936, Dennis Morgan)
- Bristol (1925, Gans Type Foundry)
- Clarence Condensed (c. 1910, R.H. Stevens)
- Expanded Antique (c. 1880) originally cast by the Figgins Foundry.
- Extra Onamented 2
- Extended 3
- Figgins Condensed No. 2 (c. 1870) originally cast by the Figgins Foundry.
- Figgins Shaded (1815) originally cast by the Figgins Foundry.
- Gresham (1925) originally cast by the Figgins Foundry (c. 1796).
- Rosart (1925, Gans Type Foundry)
