= Astur (typeface) =

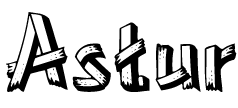
- Category: Display
- Designer: unknown
- Foundry: Nacional Typefoundry
- Date released: 1948
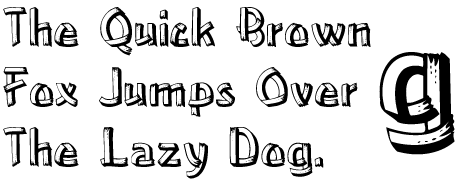
- Sample

Astur is a decorative typeface that was designed in 1940 and licensed in 1948 by Spain's Fundición Tipográfica Nacional. The letters appear to be made of wooden planks, and it is often used when an outdoor or camping look is desired. The font's name, a reference to the ancient inhabitants of northern Spain (the Astures), is meant to underline its rustic appearance.

A common software version of the font is called "Woodplank".
