= Woellmer Type Foundry =

German type foundry

Wöllmer Type Foundry
- Company type: Defunct
- Industry: Type foundry
- Founded: 1854
- Founder: Wilhelm Wöllmer
- Defunct: 1938
- Headquarters: Germany
- Key people: Wilhelm Wöllmer

The Wöllmer Type Foundry was founded by black-letter and script-type designer Wilhelm Wöllmer. Wöllmer was first an assistant in the commercial-type foundry of Eduard Haenel before founding his own company in 1854 in Berlin as a commercial printing business. Ten years later, in 1864, he supplemented the business by opening a type foundry which remained in operation until 1938.

== Typefaces ==
- Series 1-6 (1905)
- Atlantis Grotesk (1931)
- Attraktion (1925, Wöllmer)
- Barberina (1925, Wöllmer)
- Berliner Gothic (1910, Wöllmer)
- Berliner Gotisch (1909)
- Berolina (1930, Wöllmer)
- Boldrini (1902)
- Breite magere Kolonial (1911)
- Breite Magere Medieval (1894)
- Consul (1903)
- Deutsche Reichsfraktur (before 1925)
- Deutsche Reichs-Schrift (1915, Arthur Pestner)
- Drescher Eilschrift (1934, Arno Drescher)
- Empire Messing (1910s)
- Favorit (c. 1900)
- Fette Freihand Ornamente (1903)
- Fette Globus (1898)
- Fette Zabel Antiqua (Lucian Zabel)
- Freihand-Linien (1901)
- Freihand-Ornamente (1901)
- Gabriel (1938, Hans Möhring)
- Goethe Fraktur (1905)
- Halbfette Transita (1904)
- Jewel (1908)
- Jochheim Deutsch (1934, Konrad Jochheim)
- Kartenschrift Feodora (1925)
- Kartenschrift Gerda (1915)
- Kolonial (1904), also sold as Columbia by Amsterdam and as Buffalo by the H.C. Hansen Type Foundry of Boston.
- Lessing Antiqua (1908)
- Lessing Antiqua (1908)
- Mercedes (1904)
- Mercedes Antiqua (1904, Heinrich Wieynck)
- Reiher Grotesk (1904)
- Reuß-Schrift
- Römische Initialen
- Runde Buchgotisch (ca. 1900)
- Schattierte Grotesk
- Senats Antiqua (1920s)
- Siegfried (c. 1900)
- Uncial-Gotisch (c. 1900)
- Wilke-Kursiv (1932, Martin Wilke)
- Wilke Versalien (1933, Martin Wilke)
- Wöllmer Antiqua (1907, Wieynck)
- Wöllmer Fraktur (1937, Erich Meyer)
- Zabel Roman (1928-30, Zabel)
