= Arno Drescher =

- Born: 17 March 1882; Auerbach, Germany
- Died: 1 June 1971 (aged 89); Braunschweig, Germany
- Known for: typography

Arnold Drescher was trained as a teacher in Auerbach in 1896 and later studied at Dresden Academy of Fine Arts from 1905 to 1907 where he became a specialised instructor for art teachers, becoming a professor in 1920. As well as working freelance as a designer, he was also employed by the Staatliche Akademie für graphische Künste und Buchgewerbe (academy for graphic art and the book trades). Between 1940 and 1945, he was the Academy's director. As well as being a typographer, he was a prolific painter and illustrator, designing posters for the East German government. In 1960 he retired to Braunschweig where he later died.

== Fonts Designed ==
- Antiqua 505 (1956 - 1961, Johannes Wagner Type Foundry), also called Manutius.
- Arabella (1936, Johannes Wagner Type Foundry).
- Arabella Favorite (1936, Johannes Wagner Type Foundry).
- Duplex (1930, Typoart).
- Energos (1932, Schriftguss Type Foundry).
- Fundamental (1938, Johannes Wagner Type Foundry), made in four weights and two condensed versions.
- Helion (1935, Schriftguss Type Foundry and Fonderie Typographique Française).
- Super (1930, Schriftguss Type Foundry), made in four weights and a book face.
  - Super Elektrik (1930, Schriftguss Type Foundry), a shaded, oblique version of Super (1930, Schriftguss Type Foundry).
  - Super Reflex (1930, Schriftguss Type Foundry), shaded capitals for Super (1930, Schriftguss Type Foundry).
