= Akke Kumlien =

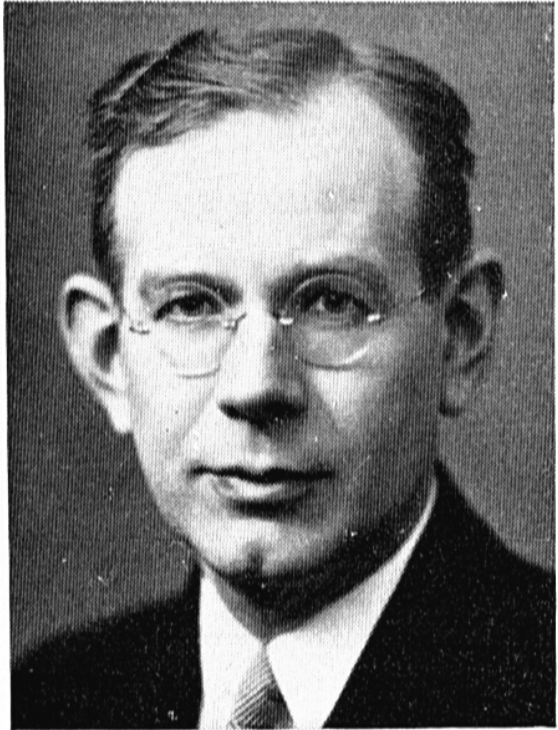
Akke Kumlien

Akke Kumlien (1884–1949) was a Swedish calligrapher, typographer, graphic designer, type designer, artist etc.

He is the author of the book Bokstav och ande (The Letter and the Spirit) (Stockholm: Norstedt, 1948) and of Kunstneren og bokkunsten.

He is the subject of the book Akke Kumlien, book designer by Bror Zachrisson.

In 2004, an exhibit of his work took place at the National Library of Sweden in Stockholm.

== Typefaces ==
In 1943 the Stempel Type Foundry released Kumlien.
