= Georg Belwe =

German type designer and graphic artist

- Born: 12 August 1878; Berlin, Germany
- Died: 1954; Ronneberg, West Germany
- Known for: typography

Georg Belwe (12 August 1878 – 1954) was a German type designer, typographer, graphic artist and teacher.

== Personal information ==
Belwe was born on 8 December 1878 in Berlin, Germany. He studied and later taught at the teaching institute of Königliches Kunstgewerbemuseum in his native Berlin.

== Career ==
=== 1900 ===
In 1900, with Fritz Helmut Ehmcke and Friedrich Wilhelm Kleukens, he founded Steglitzer Werkstadt, a private press. This same year he joins the Kunstgewerbeschule as a teacher in Berlin.

=== 1906 ===
In 1906 he became head of typography department and the class for accurate drawing at the Leipzig Akademie für Graphische Künste und Buchgewerbe.

== Productions ==
Belwe has produced numerous works for publishing houses which include:

- List
- Reclam
- Eugen Diederichs
- Westermann

== Publications ==
His publications include:

- Albert Mundt "Georg Belwe und seine Klasse an der Königlichen Akademie für graphische Künste und Buchgewerbe" in "Archiv für Buchgewerbe" In June 1910.

== Death ==
Belwe died in Ronneburg, Germany in 1954.

== Fonts Designed by Georg Belwe ==
- Belwe Roman (Schelter & Giesecke Type Foundry, 1907)
- Belwe Gotisch (1912)
- Belwe Schrägschrift (1913)
- Belwe halbfett (1914)
- Wieland (Schelter & Giesecke Type Foundry, 1926)
- Fleischman (L. Wagner Type Foundry, 1927), based on the eighteenth century designs of Joan Michaël Fleischman
- Schönschrift Mozart (1927)
- Shakespere Medaeval (Schelter & Giesecke Type Foundry, 1927–1929)

== Sources ==
- Jaspert, W. Pincus, W. Turner Berry and A.F. Johnson. The Encyclopedia of Type Faces. Blandford Press Lts.: 1953, 1983. ISBN 0-7137-1347-X.
- Friedl, Ott, and Stein, Typography: an Encyclopedic Survey of Type Design and Techniques Throughout History. Black Dog & Levinthal Publishers: 1998. ISBN 1-57912-023-7.
- Macmillsn, Niel, An A-Z of Type Designers, Yale University Press, 2006.
