= Stempel Type Foundry =

German typographic foundry

D. Stempel AG
- Company type: Aktiengesellschaft
- Industry: Type foundry
- Founded: January 15, 1895
- Founder: David Stempel
- Defunct: 1986
- Headquarters: Germany
- Key people: W. Cunz, P. Scondo (partners)

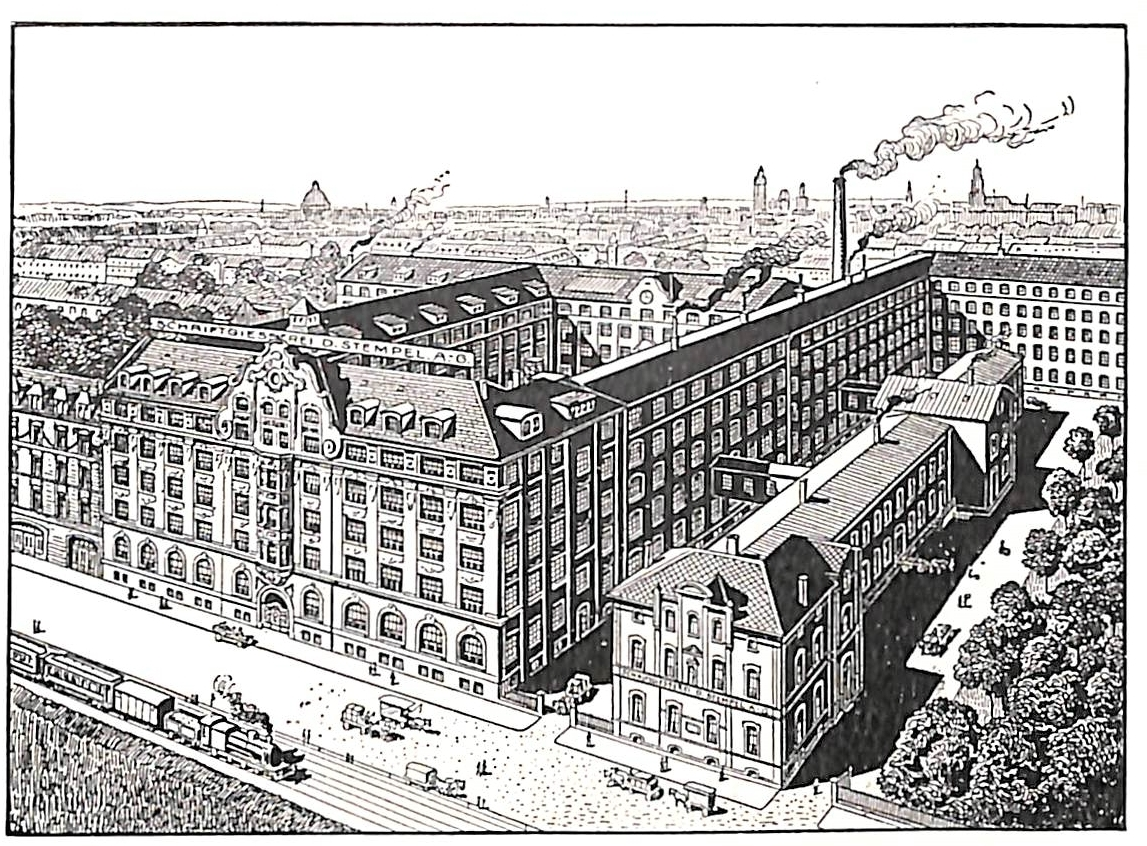
Factory of the Schriftgießerei D. Stempel in the year 1913

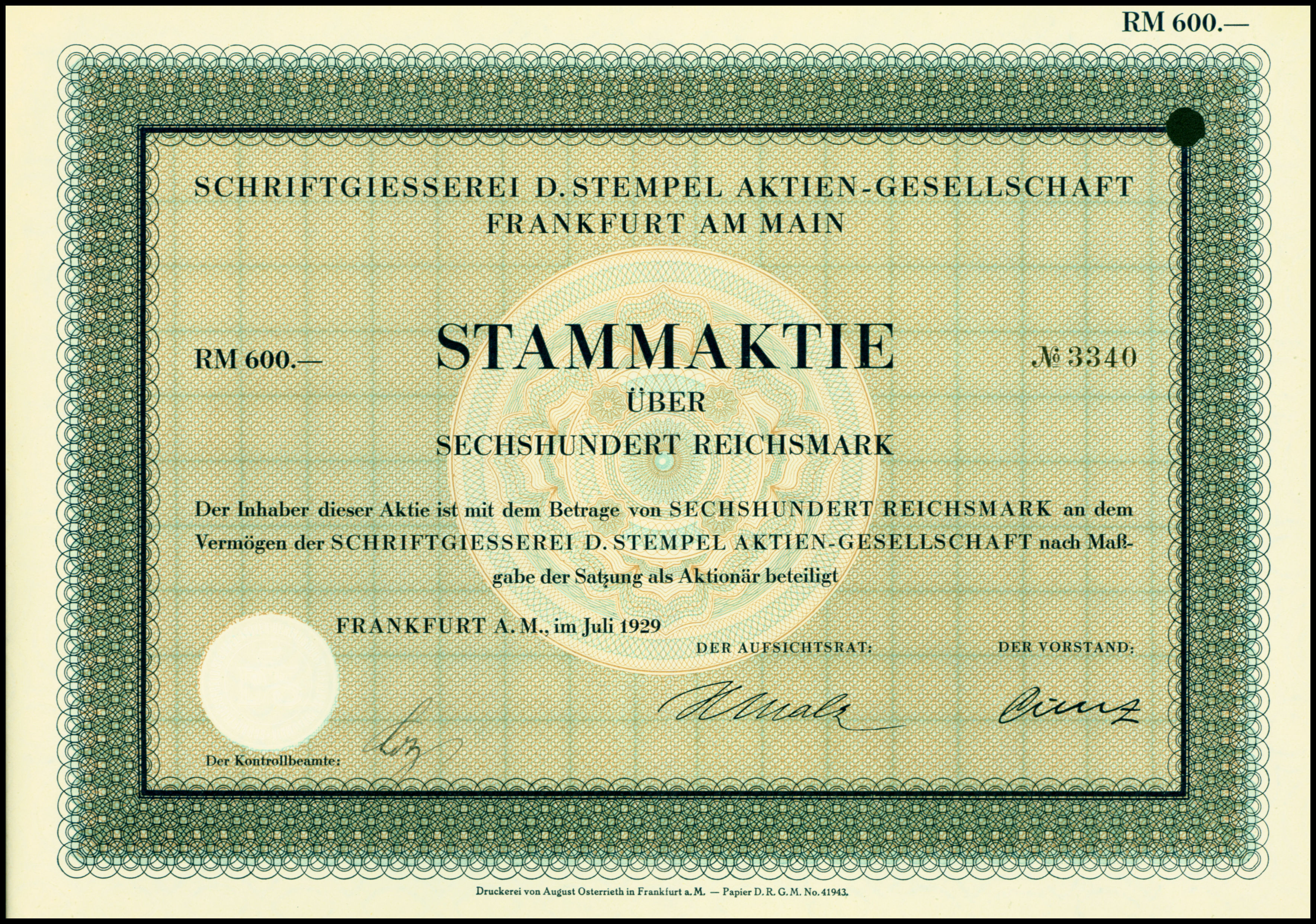
Share of the Schriftgiesserei D. Stempel AG, issued July 1929

D. Stempel AG was a German typographic foundry founded by David Stempel (1869–1927), in Frankfurt am Main, Germany. Many important font designers worked for the Stempel foundry, including Hans Bohn, Warren Chappell, F. H. Ehmcke, Friedrich Heinrichsen, Hanns Th. Hoyer, F. W. Kleukens, Erich Meyer, Hans Möhring, Hiero Rhode, Wilhelm Schwerdtner, Herbert Thannhaeuser, Martin Wilke, Rudolf Wolf, Victor Hammer, Hermann Zapf, and Gudrun Zapf von Hesse. With the introduction of Memphis in 1929, the foundry was the first to cast modern slab serif typefaces.

From 1900 to 1983, Stempel had an exclusive relationship with Mergenthaler Linotype Company, as one of just a few producers of matrices for the Linotype machine worldwide and the only one in Europe. Starting in 1925, Stempel types were distributed in the United States by Continental Type Founders Association. Linotype AG became the majority stockholder in 1941. In 1977, Stempel began manufacturing Phototypesetting equipment.

In 1985, Linotype AG purchased Stempel's type department. Stempel closed down in 1986, donating all of its type and equipment to the Darmstadt University of Technology. Schriften-Service D. Stempel GmbH has possession of the matrices of Stempel, Haas, Klingspor Bros., Deberny & Peignot, Berthold, C.E. Weber, Fonderie Olive, and the Nebiolo foundry and continues to cast their types today.

== Mergers and acquisitions ==
- 1915: D. Stempel takes over the type foundry Roos & Junge, Offenbach (established in 1886).
- 1917: D. Stempel acquires a majority share of the type foundry Klingspor Bros., Offenbach.
- 1918: D. Stempel takes over the type foundry Heinrich Hoffmeister, Leipzig (established in 1898).
- 1919: D. Stempel acquires the type division of W. Drugulin, Leipzig (established in 1800) and a share of the type foundry Brötz & Glock, Frankfurt (established in 1892).
- 1927: D. Stempel acquires a shareholding in the Haas Type Foundry in Basel/Münchenstein (established in 1790) and the two foundries begin to share matrices.
- 1933: D. Stempel acquires a shareholding in the type foundry Benjamin Krebs (Successors), Frankfurt (established in 1816).
- 1956: D. Stempel AG acquires full ownership of the type foundry Klingspor Bros., Offenbach (established in 1906).
- 1963: Linotype takes over the type foundry Genzsch + Heyse, Hamburg (established 1833).
- 1970: Stempel takes over part of the type collection of C.E. Weber (Stuttgart, est. 1927).
- 1972: The Haas'sche type foundry in Basel/Münchenstein takes over the type foundry Deberny & Peignot, Paris.
- 1978: The Haas'sche type foundry takes over Fonderie Olive, Marseille (established in 1836).

== Janson ==
Nicolas Kis's original matrices for the typeface Janson have been held by Stempel since 1919. In 1936, a revival of the face was designed by Chauncey H. Griffith of the Mergenthaler Linotype for production of both Linotype matrices and foundry type by Stempel. Today, the most common digital version, Janson Text, comes from a metal version produced by Hermann Zapf in the 1950s for Stempel, also based on Kis' original matrices.

== Typefaces ==
- Adastra (1928, Herbert Thannhaeuser)
- Aldus (1954, Hermann Zapf)
- Bravour (1912, M. Jacoby-Boy)
- Clarendon (Erich Schulz-Anker)
- Cornelia (1938, William Addison Dwiggins), originally made for machine composition by Mergenthaler Linotype Company.
- Diotima (1954, Gudrun Zapf-von Hesse)
- Discus (1939, Martin Wilke), cut in a medium and a bold. Also known as Discus Halbfett.
- Elegant-Grotesk (1929, Hans Möhring)
- Garamond (1924), based on the Egenolff-Berner sample sheet.
- Gladiola (1936, Martin Wilke).
- Globus Cursive (1932, Friedrich Wobst)
- Hammer Uncial (1953, Victor Hammer)
- Helga (1922, F.W. Kleukens)
- Hunt Roman (1962, Hermann Zapf)
- Humboldt Fraktur (1938, Hiero Rhode), named after the German researcher Alexander von Humboldt. Digitized by Helzel, Delbanco (2001, as DS Humboldt Fraktur), Gerhard Helzel, and Dieter Steffmann (2002).
  - Humboldt Fraktur halbfett (1938, Hiero Rhode)
  - Humboldt Fraktur Bierbuchftaben (1938, Hiero Rhode)
- Janson (c. 1690, Nicholas Kis)
- Janson (1950s revision, Hermann Zapf)
- Jeannette, originally cast by Haas as Ideal Roman.
- Kompakt (1954, Hermann Zapf)
- Kumlien (1943, Akke Kumlien)
- Kuenstler Script (1957, Hans Bohn)
- Madison Antiqua (1909-19, revised 1965)
- Melior (1952, Hermann Zapf)
- Memphis (1929, Rudolf Wolf), sold by Continental as Girder.
- Metropolis (1929, Wilhelm Schwerdtner)
- Mondial (1936, Hans Bohn)
- Mundus (1929, Wilhelm Schwerdtner)
- Paladin (1922, M. Jacoby-Boy)
- Palatino (1950, Hermann Zapf)
- Syntax (1968, Hans E. Meier)
