= Schelter & Giesecke Type Foundry =

German type foundry and printing press manufacturer

J.G. Schelter & Giesecke
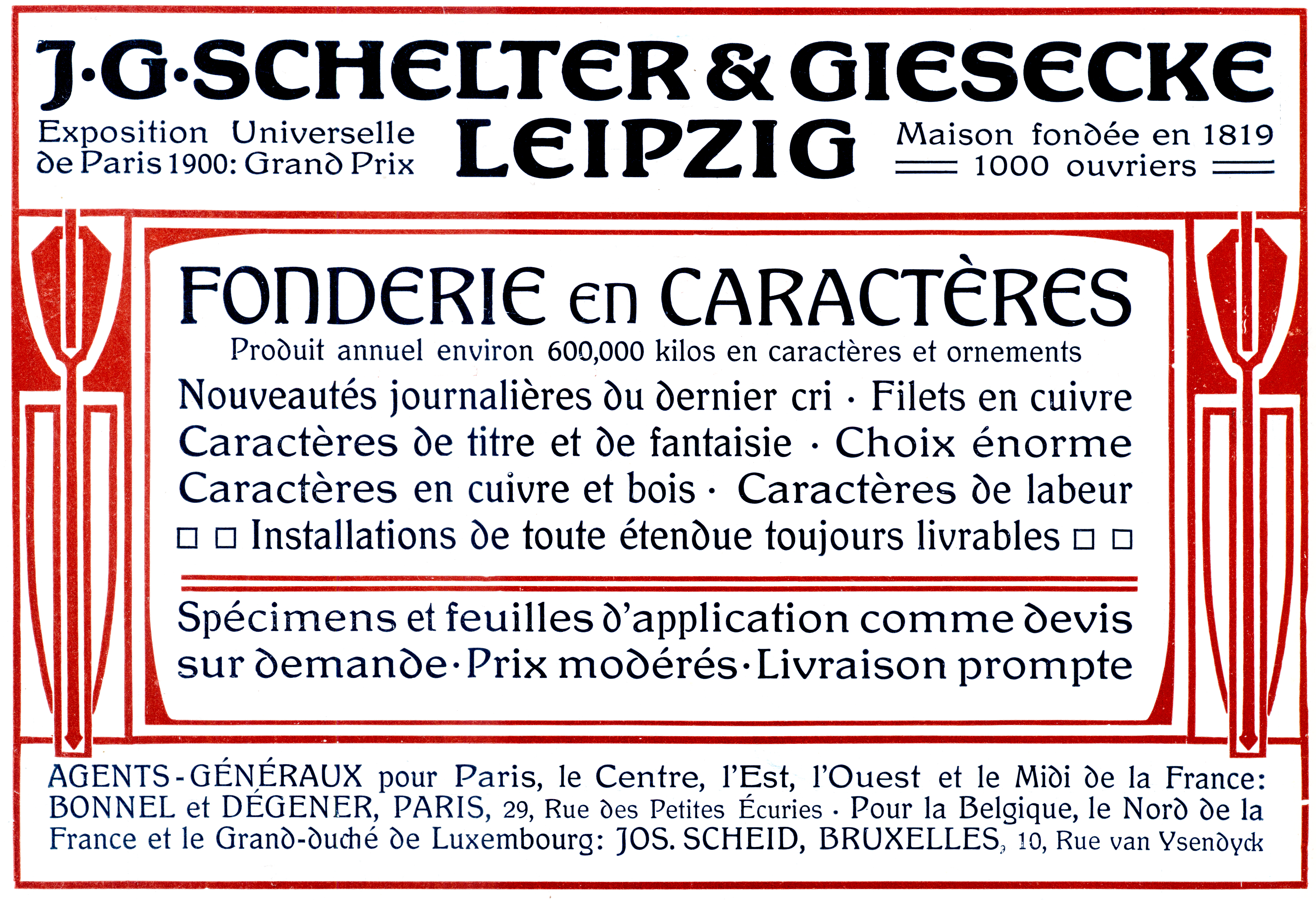
- Type: Aktiengesellschaft
- Industry: Type foundry
- Founded: 1819
- Founder: Johann Schelter, Christian Giesecke
- Defunct: 1946
- Headquarters: Leipzig, Germany
- Key people: Georg Belwe

J.G. Schelter & Giesecke was a German type foundry and manufacturer of printing presses started 1819 in Leipzig by punchcutter Johann Schelter and typefounder Christian Friedrich Giesecke (1793-1850). The foundry was nationalized in 1946 by the new German Democratic Republic, forming VEB Typoart, Dresden.

== Typefaces ==
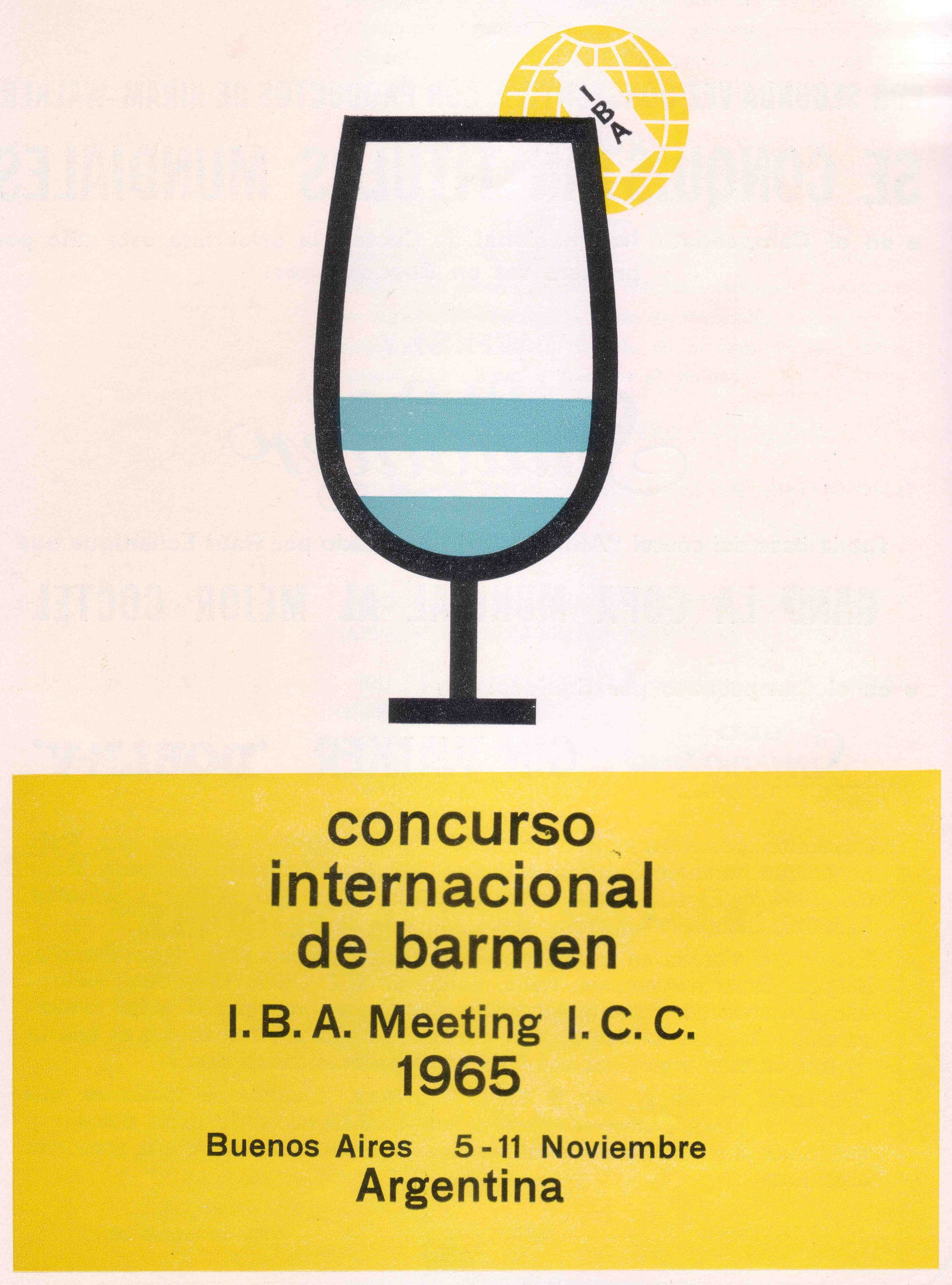
A poster for the International Bartenders Association competition of 1965 uses the company's popular Breite halbfette Grotesk.

These foundry types were produced by Schelter & Giesecke:

- Accidenz-Zierat (1902)
- Akantrea (1883), borders and ornaments
- Akropolis Ornamente (1907)
- Alt Latein (1924)
- Baldur Baldur (1895) open and shaded variant of Wodan (1894). Revived by Alan Prescott as New Baldur APT (1996).
- Belwe Roman (1907, Georg Belwe)
- Biedermeierzierat (1905)
- Borghese (1904) An Art Nouveau face, revived by Ralph M. Unger as Borghese (2015).
- Breite Grotesk (1886) This typeface influenced the Bauhaus movement and was a forerunner of Helvetica. Revived by Nick Curtis as Schelter Grotesk NF (2010), and by Arve Båtevik as Sagen Grotesk, Breite Halbfette Grotesk and Breite magere Grotesk (2015).
- Breite Kanzlei (1835; other publications mention 1890) + Halbfette Kanzlei (1860)
- Die Zierde (1913, F.H. Ernst Schneidler), ornaments
- Dolmen (1922, Max Salzmann)
  - Zierdolmen (1922, Max Salzmann), a decorated version of Dolmen.
- Edelgotisch (1901, Albert Knab)
- Fafner + Schraffierte (1905) Revived by Oliver Weiss / Walden Font Co. as WF Fafner (2020)
- Fanal (1933), angular blackletterish script face
- Fee (1907), handwriting.
- Flamme (1933), brush-like script
- Gnom + breite Gnom (1928)
- Gravira (1935, Herbert Thannhaueser)
- Gudrum The bicolor combination of Wodan (fill) and Baldur (open).
- Gutenberg-Gotisch (1885) + Halbfette Gutenberg-Gotisch (1890) The original by F.W. Bauer and Th. Friebel dates from 1880.
- Hispania Script (1890), a pirate map face
- Initialen zur Rousseau (1907)
- Italian Renaissance (1883) a black-letter face
- Jugend-Fraktur (ca. 1900)
- Kalender Vignetten (1907, Max Salzmann)
- Kartuschen Einfassung serie 72 (1887), ornaments
- Kolibri (1928)
- Koralle (1929 Georg Kraus mentions the date 1915, as does Nick Curtis. Curtis based his Koralle NF (2012) and Koralle Rounded NF (2014) on this typeface; see also the recent revival Koralle RMU (2018) by Ralph M. Unger.
- Leipziger Lateinschrift (1908)
- Liane (1908) Revived by Oliver Weiss / Walden Font Co. as WF Fafner (2020)
- Meierschrift (1904-1908, C.F. Meier) Revived by Oliver Weiss / Walden Font Co. as WF Meierschrift (2020)
- Mimosenzierat (1909, Heinz Keune)
- Moderne enge halbfette Fraktur (1886)
- Monos (1912)
- Münster-Gotisch (1896) Revived by Paulo W as Münster Gotische (2009). Gerhard Helzel also did a revival.
- Patriz Huber Ornamente (1906, Patriz Huber) Revived by Oliver Weiss / Walden Font Co. as WF Border Patriz Huber (2020)
- Perkeo (1928)
- Reklameschrift Radium (1904-1906) Revived by Oliver Weiss / Walden Font Co. as WF Radium (2020)
- Roland Grotesk (1910)
- Roland Kursiv (1910)
- Romanisch, later copied by the Central Type Foundry of Saint Louis as De Vinne.
- Rosenzierat Serien 534 und 535 (1905, Heinz Keune)
- Rundgotisch (1909; others say 1902-1903)
- Salzmann Antiqua (1913, Max Salzmann)
- Salzmann Fraktur + Kräftige Salzmann Fraktur (1911, Max Salzmann)
- Salzmann Kursiv (1911, Max Salzmann)
- Salzmannschrift + Salzmannschrift halbfette + schmale Salzmannschrift (1910, Max Salzmann)
- Saskia (1931, Jan Tschichold)
- Schelter Antiqua (1906) Revived by Oliver Weiss / Walden Font Co. as WF Schelter Antiqua (2020).
  - Leipziger Lateinschrift (1907) a variant of Schelter Antiqua.
  - Tauchnitz-Antiqua (1907) a variant of Schelter Antiqua.
- Schelter Kursiv (1906)
- Schlanke Grotesk (1886)
- Schlanke Grotesk (1886)
- Schmale Anker Romanisch (1908), a German Romanesque.
- Schmale fette Edelgotisch und Zierat (1907)
- Schmale fette Schelterantiqua (1908)
- Schmale Medieäval (1840) Rived in 2020 by Ralph M. Unger as Schmale Mediaeval.
- Schmale Steinschrift (1898)
- Schul-Fraktur (1886) + Fette (1890) + Schmale fette (1918) Digitization by Delbanco as DS-Schulfraktur (2001).
- Shakespere Mediäval (1927–1929, Georg Belwe)
- Shieldface A (1881) caps only
- Shieldface Combinationpieces (1881), ornamental
- Silhouette Border Series 63 (1884)
- Tauperle (1928)
- Titan + Titan Gnom (1915)
- Walgunde mit Zieraten (1908, Eduard Lautenbach)
- Walküre The grey variant of Wodan.
- Watteau-Schrift + Watteau Schmuck (1913), aka Kartenschrift Watteau, a non-connected script.
- Wieland (1926, Georg Belwe)
- Wodan (1894),
- Zierschrift 1328 (1889)
- Zierschrift 1400 (1889)

The foundry claimed by the twentieth century to have been one of the first to offer general-purpose sans-serif typefaces with lower-case, as early as 1825. This was repeated by some authors, but is now known to be untrue: Wolfgang Homola dates it to 1882 based on a study of Schelter & Giesecke specimens. (Note: Walter Tracy also comments that the claimed date is "forty years too early" and James Mosley describes it as "thoroughly discredited".)

== Press Manufacturing ==
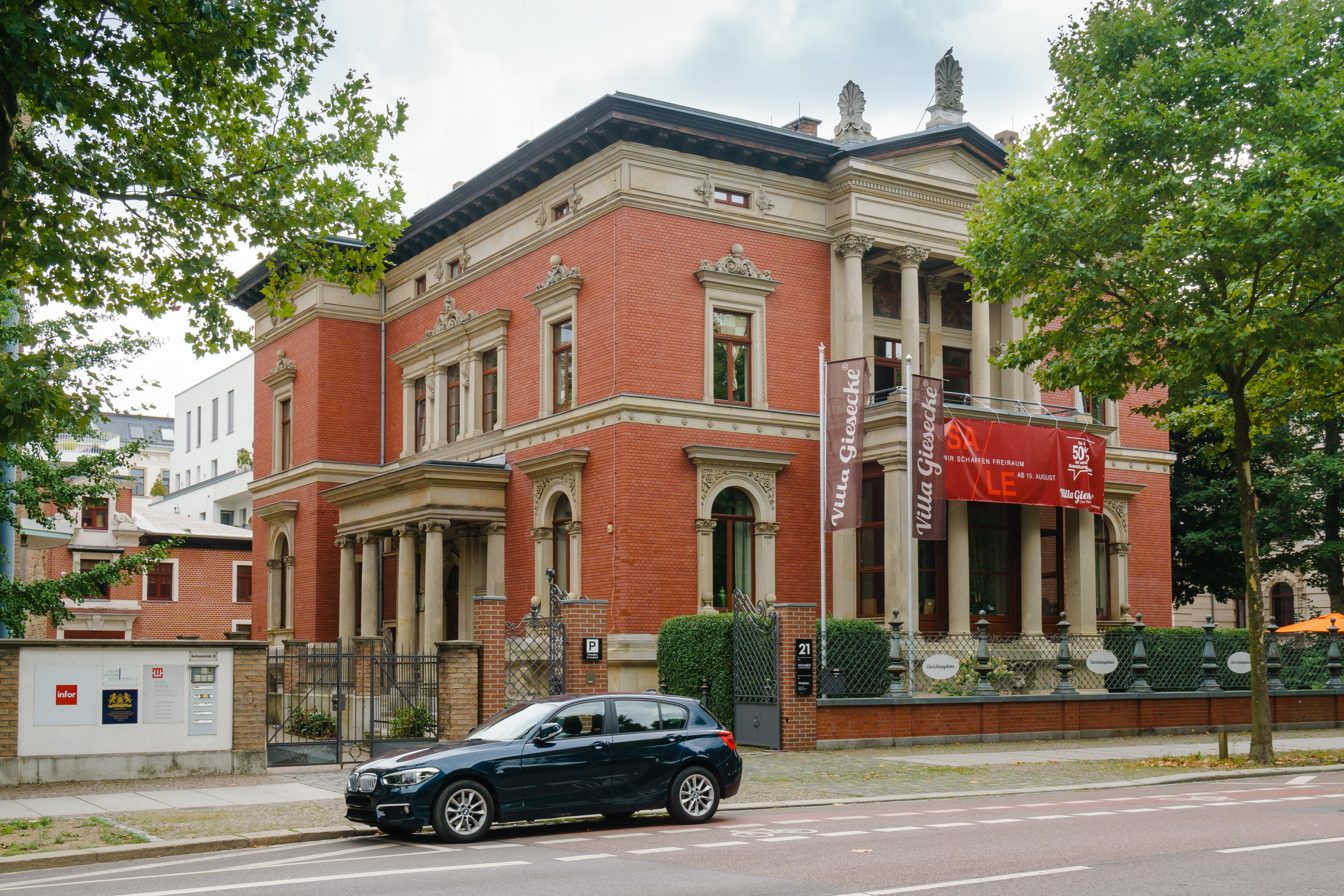
Villa Georg Giesecke, the Leipzig house of foundry co-owner Georg Giesecke

Beginning in 1827 Schelter & Giesecke manufactured letterpress presses, cylinder proof presses and platen presses; and after World War I also of web-fed, letterpress and flexo printing presses.

The Leipzig house of foundry co-owner Georg Giesecke, designed by Berlin architect Max Hasak, survives and is listed.
