= Fritz Kredel =

German-American artist (1900–1973)

- Born: February 8, 1900; Michelstadt-im-Odenwald, Germany
- Died: April 12, 1973 (aged 73); New York City, New York, U.S.
- Occupations: Graphic designer, illustrator

Fritz Kredel (February 8, 1900 – April 12, 1973) was a German, later American artist and graphic designer.

== Early years ==
He was born in Michelstadt-im-Odenwald, then in the Grand Duchy of Hesse of the German Empire. In his early years, he studied under Rudolf Koch at Offenbach School of Art and Design, and developed skills in woodcuts. In 1920, he began studying at the Kunstgewerbeschule in Offenbach am Main. Koch and Kredel collaborated on A Book of Signs (1923) and The Book of Flowers (1930). Following Koch's death in 1934, Kredel moved to Frankfurt, but in 1938, he fled Germany for political reasons with help from Melbert Cary.

== Career ==
After emigrating to the United States that year, he taught at Cooper Union in New York and continued to work as an artist. He produced illustrations for over 400 books in German and English and received many awards and honors. Many of his originals are now housed at the Art Library at Yale University.

Kredel illustrated Eleanor Roosevelt's children's book, Christmas (Alfred A. Knopf, 1940), and was commissioned to create a woodcut of the Presidential Seal for the inauguration of John F. Kennedy in 1961. He illustrated 21 volumes for George Macy's Limited Edition Club, the most of any of their illustrators (cf. Heritage Press), and the original World's Best Fairy Tales for Reader's Digest Association (1967). The Limited Edition Club titles include The Complete Andersen: All of the Stories of Hans Christian Andersen in Six Volumes, a limited edition of 1500 sets for the Limited Editions Club (completed as a set, 1949, LCCN 49-3049). Kredel also colored the John Tenniel illustrations for Lewis Carroll's Alice's Adventures in Wonderland and Through the Looking-Glass for the 1946 Random House editions. From 1950 until his death Kredel received numerous awards, including Honorary Citizen Award from the Town of Michelstadt (1969). Died 12 of April 1973 in New York. Kredel was married to a woman who had been born Jewish, but who converted to Christianity while working with Rudolf Koch. Annie Kredel was a textile artist. The couple had two children.

== Other Resources ==
- Zipes, Jack, ed. (2000), The Oxford Companion to Fairy Tales, Oxford and New York: Oxford University Press, ISBN 0-9653635-7-0
- Kredel Brown, Mathilde and Judith Kredel Brown (editors) (2000), Fritz Kredel, New York: Steinhour Press
- Brown Swanson, Mathilde; Kredel, Mathilde (July 2013). "Fritz Kredel: Artist, Illustrator and Grandfather". Printing History (14). Archived from the original on December 8, 2019 – via Questia.
