= Johannes Wagner Type Foundry =

Johannes Wagner, Inh.
- Industry: Type foundry
- Founded: 1921
- Founder: Johannes Wagner
- Headquarters: Ingolstadt, Germany

Johannes Wagner, Inh. was a type foundry created in 1921 by Johannes Wagner with his brother and brother-in-law in Berlin, moving to Ingolstadt in 1956. In the early 1980s the firm acquired many of the matrices of the Weber Typefoundry and most of those from Berthold. The company, by then named Letternservice Ingolstadt, closed in 2002, and its printing assets were moved to the printing museum in Leipzig.

== Typefaces ==
These foundry types were produced by the Wagner Type Foundry:

- Antiqua 505 (1940, Arno Drescher), also called Manutius.
- Hiero Rhode Antiqua (1944, Hiero Rhode), digitized by Ari Rafaeli (2006).
  - Hiero Rhode Antiqua fett (1946, Hiero Rhode)
- Hiero Rhode Roman (1945, Hiero Rhode)
  - Hiero Rhode Roman Italic (1945, Karl Hans Walter)
  - Hiero Rhode Roman fett (1945, Hiero Rhode)
