= Nacional Typefoundry =

Closed type foundry in Spain

Fundición Tipográfica Nacional
- Type: Defunct
- Industry: Type foundry
- Founded: Madrid, Spain (1915)
- Defunct: 1971
- Headquarters: Madrid, Spain
- Key people: Carlos Winkow, Enric Crous-Vidal

Fundición Tipográfica Nacional or the Nacional Typefoundry was for many years the leading type foundry of Spain. It was founded in Madrid in 1915 and functioned there until bought out by Fundición Tipográfica Neufville of Barcelona in 1971. It employed prestigious designers like Carlos Winkow and Enric Crous-Vidal and was noted for its bold and striking art deco faces.

== Typefaces ==
- Alcazar (1944, Carlos Winkow)
- Alfrodita
- Astur
- Belinda
- Cursiva Rusinol, based on Carlos Winkow's Reporter
- Electra, digitized by Font Bureau as Romeo; not to be confused with a similarly named typeface by William Addison Dwiggins for Linotype
- Hispalis
- Iberica (1942, Carlos Winkow)
- Ilerda (1954, Enric Crous-Vidal)
- Inglés
- Imperio
- Interpol
- Nacional (1941, Carlos Winkow)
- Numantina
- Radar
- Victoriana
