= List of script typefaces =

This is a list of script typefaces. This list details standard script typefaces and computer fonts used in classical typesetting and printing.

== Calligraphic ==
Samples of Calligraphic Script typefaces
Typeface name	Example 1	Example 2	Example 3
American Scribe			
AMS Euler Designer: Hermann Zapf, Donald Knuth			—N/a
Apple Chancery Designer: Kris Holmes			
Brush Script Designer: Robert E. Smith			
Cézanne Designer: Michael Want, Richard Kegler			—N/a
Coronet Designer: R. Hunter Middleton			
Declaration Script		—N/a	—N/a
Declare		—N/a	—N/a
Edwardian Script Designer: Ed Benguiat			
FIG Script Designer: Eric Olson			
French Script			—N/a
Gravura Designer: Phill Grimshaw			—N/a
Kuenstler Script Designer: Hans Bohn			
Lucida Calligraphy Designer: Charles Bigelow, Kris Holmes			
Monotype Corsiva Designer: Tricia Saunders			
Snell Roundhand Designer: Matthew Carter			
Zapf Chancery Designer: Hermann Zapf			—N/a
Zapfino Designer: Hermann Zapf			

== Handwriting ==
Samples of Handwriting Script typefaces
Typeface name	Example 1	Example 2	Example 3
Alexa Designer: Steve Matteson			—N/a
Andy Designer: Steve Matteson			
Ashley Script Designer: Ashley Havinden		—N/a	
Balloon Designer: Max R. Kaufmann			—N/a
Blackadder			
Caflisch Script Designer: Robert Slimbach		—N/a	
Chalkboard			
Comic Sans MS Designer: Vincent Connare			
Dom Casual Designer: Peter Dom			
Eyadish	—N/a	—N/a	
Freestyle Script Designer: Martin Wait		—N/a	
Kaufmann Designer: Max R. Kaufmann		—N/a	
Kristen Designer: George Ryan		—N/a	
Lobster Designer: Pablo Impallari	—N/a	—N/a	
Lucida Handwriting Designer: Charles Bigelow, Kris Holmes			
Mistral Designer: Roger Excoffon			
Ondine Designer: Adrian Frutiger			
Papyrus Designer: Chris Costello		—N/a	
Pristina		—N/a	
Rage		—N/a	
Segoe Script Designer: Carl Crossgrove		—N/a	—N/a
Viner Hand		—N/a	
Wiesbaden Swing Designer: Rosemarie Kloos-Rau		—N/a	—N/a

== Additional script typefaces ==
- Choc
- Choco Cooky
- Civilité
- Comic Neue
- Forte
- Gabriola
- Grecs du roi
- National Archive
- Poetica
- POP
- Sarir Script
- Signal
- Ugly Gerry
- Universal Typeface Experiment
- Vaybertaytsh

== See also ==
- Antiqua (typeface) – Typefaces that mimic 15th and 16th century Western European handwriting
- List of display typefaces
- List of monospaced typefaces
- List of sans serif typefaces
- List of serif typefaces
