= Optima =

Humanist sans-serif typeface

- Category: Sans-serif
- Classification: Humanist
- Designer: Hermann Zapf
- Foundry: Stempel
- Date released: 1958
- Re-issuing foundries: Linotype

Optima is a humanist sans-serif typeface designed by Hermann Zapf and released by the D. Stempel AG foundry, Frankfurt, West Germany, in 1958.

Though classified as a sans-serif, Optima has a subtle swelling at the terminals suggesting a glyphic serif. Optima was inspired by classical Roman capitals and the stonecarving on Renaissance-period tombstones Zapf saw in Florence on a 1950 holiday to Italy.

Zapf intended Optima to be a typeface that could serve for both body text and titling. To prove its versatility, Zapf set his entire book About Alphabets in the regular weight. Zapf retained an interest in the design, collaborating on variants and expansions into his eighties.

== History ==
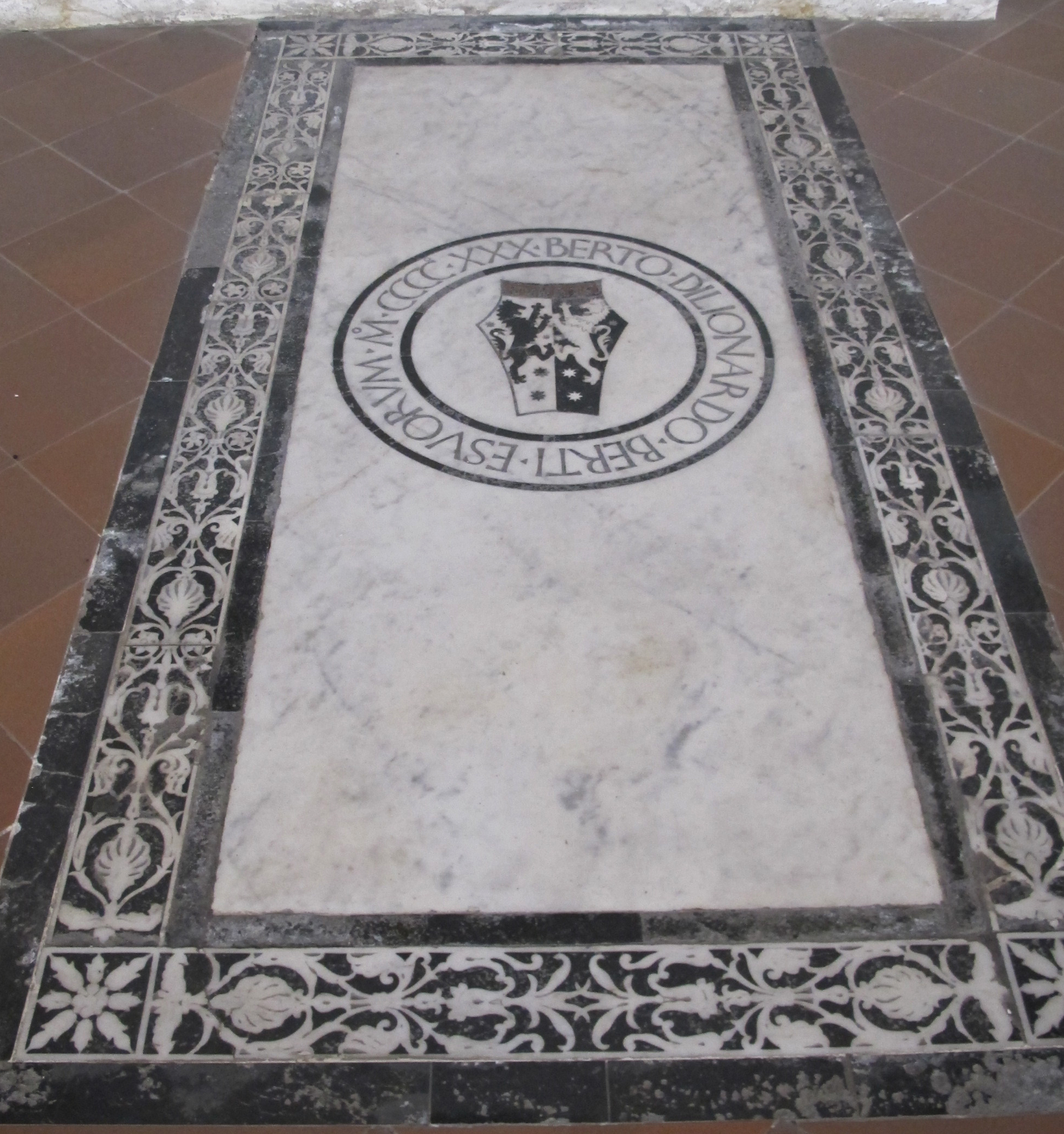
Zapf cited this 15th-century gravestone as inspiring Optima. Portions of the text are copied onto one of his 1950 sketches.

Interested in calligraphy and the history of Italian printing and lettering, Zapf first visited Italy in 1950. While in Florence, Zapf was particularly interested in the design of the lettering in tombstones of the cemetery of the Basilica di Santa Croce in Florence, in which the strokes subtly widen as they reach stroke terminals without ending in a serif. He quickly sketched an early draft of the design on a 1000 lira banknote. Zapf was to work on the development of Optima during most of the following decade.

In his book About Alphabets, Zapf commented that his key aim in designing Optima's capitals, inspired by the Roman capital model, was the desire to avoid the monotony of all capital letters having a roughly square footprint, as he felt was true of some early sans-serif designs. Like the Roman capitals, Optima's 'E' and 'R' occupy about a half-square, the 'M' is wide and its sides are splayed.

On the suggestion of Monroe Wheeler of the Museum of Modern Art in New York City, Zapf decided to adapt his typeface to be used as a book type. "He thereupon changed the proportions of the lowercase, and by means of photography, he tested the suitability of the design for continuous reading application." Zapf designed the capital letters of Optima after the inscriptions on the Trajan Column (A.D. 113). Optima was the first German typeface not based on the standard baseline alignment. Zapf stated: "This base line is not ideal for a roman, as it was designed for the high x-height of the Fraktur and Textura letters. Thus, too many German types have ascenders which are too long and descenders which are too short. The proportions of Optima Roman are now in the Golden Section: lowercase x-height equalling the minor and ascenders-descenders the major. However, the curved lines of the stems of each letter result from technical considerations of type manufacturing rather than purely aesthetic considerations."

The development of Optima occurred during the period 1955–1958. Optima was first manufactured as a foundry version in 1958 by Stempel of Frankfurt, and by Mergenthaler in America shortly thereafter. It was released to the public at an exhibition in Düsseldorf the same year. Zapf himself wanted to name the new type face New Roman, but the marketing staff insisted that it be named Optima. In a memoir written for Linotype, Zapf commented:

The name "Optima" was not my idea at all. It is for me too presumptuous and was the invention of the sales people at Stempel.

Zapf wrote later in his life of his preference for Optima over all of his other typefaces, but he also mentioned “a father should not have a favorite among his daughters.”

== Structure ==
Optima's design follows humanist lines; Its capitals (like those of Palatino, Hans Eduard Meier's Syntax and Carol Twombly's Trajan) originate from the classic Roman monumental capital model, reflecting a reverence for Roman capitals as an ideal form.

Optima is an example of a modulated-stroke sans-serif, a design type where the strokes are variable in width. The design style has been intermittently favored since the late nineteenth century; Optima is one of the most lasting examples of the genre. Optima was originally targeted by Stempel's Walter Cunz as a competitor to Ludwig & Mayer's Colonia design, which has not been digitised. Shaw also suggests the little-known 1948 design Romann Antiqua, as well as Stellar by Robert Hunter Middleton as predecessors, and notes the existence of Pascal by José Mendoza y Almeida (1962) as a design with a similar set of influences. Optima is however quite restrained in stroke width variation; more display-oriented predecessors such as Britannic show far more differentiation in stroke width than Optima does.

Optima's sloped version was originally an oblique or sloped roman, in which the letters do not take on handwriting characteristics. For Optima nova (discussed below) Zapf decided to create a new true italic with a greater slant angle.

During late development of Optima, Zapf also began working on a non-modulated sans for Linotype, to be named Magnus and intended to compete with Gill Sans. It has never been released.

== Optima Greek (1973) ==
A Greek variant designed by Matthew Carter, based on sketches from Hermann Zapf. No digital versions have been produced.

== Optima Classified (1976) ==
A variant designed by Matthew Carter, based closely on Optima Medium. No digital versions have been produced.

== Optima nova (2002) ==
A specimen image of Optima Nova showing its italic, stylistic alternates and condensed weights

"Optima nova" is a redesign of the original font family, designed by Zapf and Linotype GmbH type director Akira Kobayashi. The new family contains seven font weights, adding light, demi, and heavy font weights, but removing extra black weight. Medium weight is readjusted to between medium and bold weights in the old family scale. Glyph sets are expanded to include Adobe CE and Latin Extended characters, with light to bold weight fonts supporting proportional lining figures, old style figures, and small caps.

The initial and most common release of Optima, like many sans-serif fonts, has an oblique style instead of an italic: the shapes are merely tilted to the right. In Optima nova, this is replaced by a true italic. (In interviews, Zapf has said that this was his original goal from the beginning, but the need to release Optima quickly forced him to settle for an oblique.)

Even in Roman fonts, letters such as Q, a, f are redesigned. The overall bounding boxes were widened in Optima nova.

Reviewing it, John Berry wrote that "its 'color' on the page comes much closer to that of the original metal version than any of the earlier photo/digital versions did" but that "ends of the strokes in the letters 'a', 'c', and 's' flare much more dramatically than they ever did in the older Optima — so much so that these letters almost look as though they have serifs...It’s a subtle difference, but it’s disturbing if you’re used to the understated elegance of Optima’s letterforms."

=== Optima nova Condensed ===
A condensed variant which consists of light to bold weights, but no italic fonts. The glyph set does not support proportional lining figures, old style figures, or small caps.

=== Optima nova Titling ===
A titling capitals variant, which contains only capital letters, with restyled letterform. The glyph set is the same as "Optima nova Condensed", but also includes extra ligatures. Berry writes in his review of the "nova" release: "it has softly curved joins and interior angles. Instead of the added crispness of detail that you might expect of a face designed for display use, this one looks more sculptural."

In the tradition of hand lettering and lapidary inscription, the titling face shares similarities with the work of Zapf's friend Herb Lubalin, especially the exuberant ligatures (for which Lubalin's ITC Lubalin Graph and ITC Avant Garde are notable). Further influence of A.M. Cassandre and Rudolf Koch, whose work greatly inspired the young Zapf, can also be seen in Optima.

== Optima Pro Cyrillic (2010) ==
In April 2010, Linotype announced the release of Cyrillic version of the original Optima family, in OpenType Pro font formats. Released fonts include Optima Pro Cyrillic Roman, Oblique, Bold, Bold Oblique.

== Derivatives ==
As with many commonly used fonts, knockoff designs and re-releases under different names have been released, some created by Zapf himself. These all tend to copy the original version, rather than the Optima nova design which represents Zapf's final thoughts on the design. In the Bitstream font collection, Zapf Humanist 601 is provided as an Optima clone. Other Optima clones include Optane from the WSI Fonts collection, Opulent by Rubicon Computer Labs Inc., Ottawa from Corel, CG Omega and Eterna. Freely available implementations include URW Classico (available with URW Font package from Ghostscript). Linux Biolinum and Libertinus Sans are libre fonts inspired by it. Zapf's Palatino Sans is a more informal typeface in the same style, with a design reminiscent of brushstrokes or calligraphy.

Kontour Type designed the Utile Display typeface, inspired from the Optima typeface.

== Notable usages ==
Expo 67 Montreal

Optima is used for the Vietnam Veterans Memorial in Washington and used in the official logo and most publications associated with Expo 67 in Montreal.

Optima was chosen as the font for the names of those who lost their lives in the September 11 attacks, carved into the bronze parapets of the National September 11 Memorial & Museum. It was also used by U.S. politician John McCain's 2008 presidential campaign.

== Reception ==
Critical opinion on Optima has been mixed, shaped in part by its widespread adoption. Erik Spiekermann described it as "used on parking garages & hospitals across the United States. Tired & inappropriate. I don't blame the typeface but the designers." He also commented: "Optima is patronizing. It hasn't got the guts to be either a proper Sans or Serif, so it keeps all its options open and appeals to the middle...It suits everything and pleases nobody."

Jonathan Hoefler described it as "signifying a very down-market notion of luxe...the font of choice for the hygiene aisle."
