= Freestyle Script =

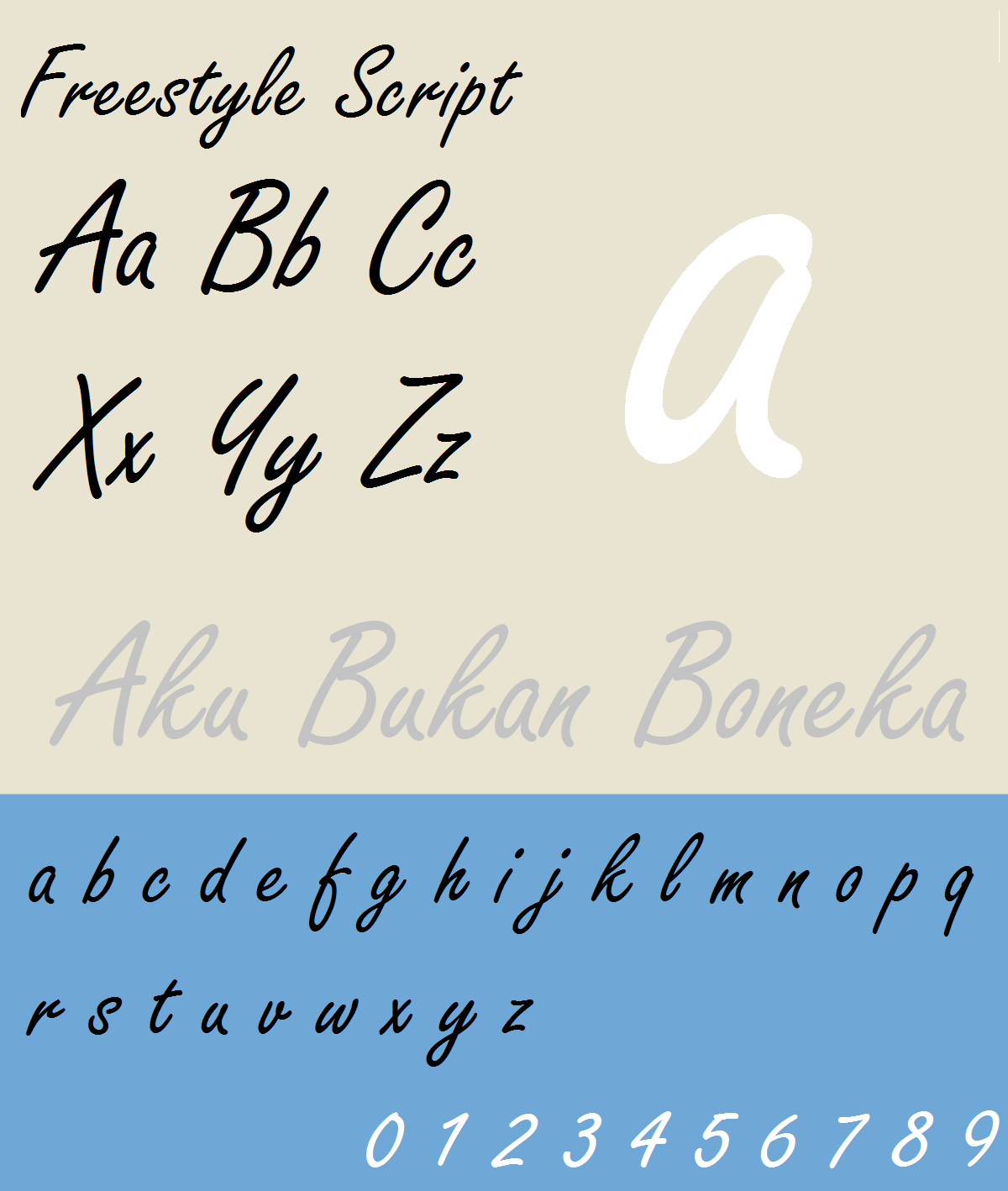
- Category: Script
- Designer: Martin Wait
- Date released: 1981

Text of Freestyle Script

Freestyle Script is an informal display script typeface that was designed by Colin Brignall in 1969 and Martin Wait in 1981, by Letraset. Freestyle Script has been used for commercials, birthday cards, decorations, and logos. The bold version was designed in 1986. The publishers of this font are Adobe, ITC, Monotype Imaging, Elsner+Flake, Esselte Corporation (in 1997), Scangraphic Type, Linotype, Image Club, and Letraset. This font has a few versions, namely Regular, Bold, LT, Plain, LET, EF, SB, SH, SH Reg Alt, and SB Reg Alt. Freestyle Script font supports up to 78 different languages for cursive (plain) and 33 different languages for other styles (Regular, Bold, Alt, etc.). The Cyrillic version of Freestyle Script was created in 1993, consisting of the glyphs in Latin supplement. The font has been included in MyFonts since 2000.

== History ==
Freestyle Script was first designed by Colin Brignall in 1969 and then by Martin Wait in 1981 for regular and cursive font. The bold version was released in 1986, which several of its digital versions lack proper weight. In 1993, the fonts similar to Freestyle Script in all glyphs are called "VI My Ha Hoa" and "VI My Ha." Those fonts are all caps and designed by VISCII Fonts in 1993. URW++ used to have a version named URW Fresnel in 1996, and it is similar to this font. SG Freestyle Script's SB Regular Alternative is also available but some letters are different from original Freestyle Script. In 2003, the Freestyle Script font was added to Microsoft Word, and it is continued with succeeding versions such as Word 2007, Word 2010, Word 2013, Word 2016 and Word 2019. The font is in TrueType font format.

== Reception ==
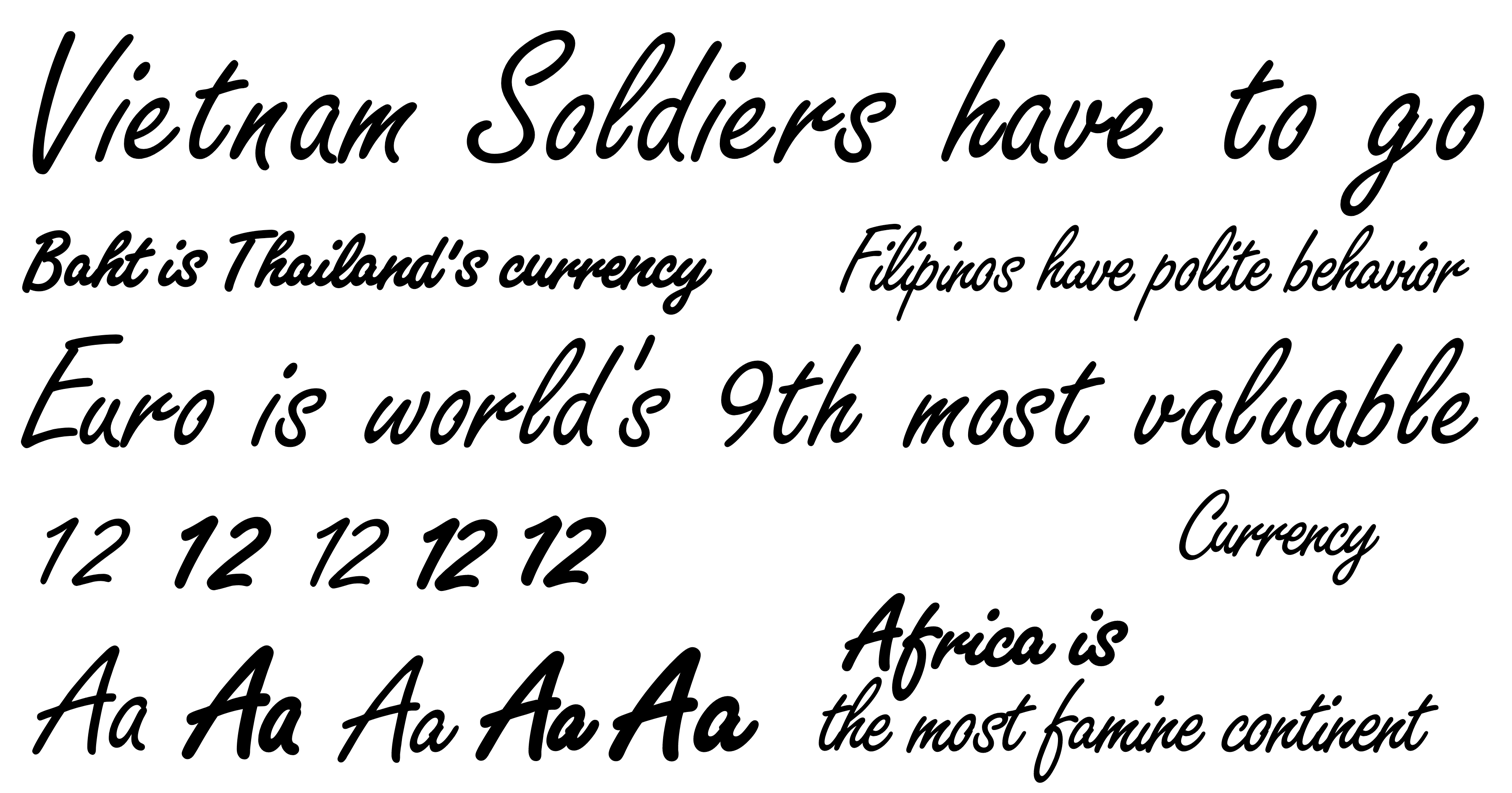
Versions of Freestyle Script

=== Opposition ===
The font Bradley Hand and other handwritten fonts (including Freestyle Script) were banned on the website Webdesigner Depot in 2010. It was ranked 8th among the top banned fonts. Those banned fonts, including Freestyle Script, were said to be "annoying".

In March 8, 2018, the website Illumine 8 described Freestyle Script as Adobe's poor attempt to fool people into believing that the font is handwritten. Illumine 8 ranked Freestyle Script as the 14th worst handwritten font in the first round of voting. Freestyle Script was not included in the following rounds.

=== Glyph copying to other typefaces ===
Because of some oppositions from the typographists for Freestyle Script typeface, there are typefaces that duplicates some of the glyphs that infringe copyright from original designers of this typeface (as there are no official permit from any company that own it), like and Photoshoot that showed on some glyphs that were allegedly the inspiration of some techniques for Freestyle Script typeface. There are typefaces that legitimately made even there are similarities on glyphs and are open source like Yellowtail.

=== Name copying ===
There is a faux calligraphy typeface called "Freestyle" (alternately "Freestyle Script" faux calligraphy typeface) that could confuse many graphic designers who use Microsoft to search or download a particular typeface. It was first listed on August 23, 2016, and the typeface costs US$14 lower (that duplicate typeface name costs US$15) than the original typeface that can be seen at MyFonts. There is another typeface used the same name (alternately "Freestyle Script" brush calligraphy typeface) that could also confuse graphic designers to the original typeface name. The designers however, did answer the comment yet why that name are they used than changing to the other name. In reality, those typeface designers are about to confuse people who are using the original Freestyle Script typeface to force its downfall to the original owner that designed the typeface.

=== Defense ===
- On the blog site The Creative Hustler: Freestyle Script was ranked as 29th of the best cursive fonts.
- On Allfonts.co: Freestyle Script was included as one of the best cursive fonts in 2021, stating "It is not like the traditional handwritten fonts, and has separated characters. It is a handwritten typeface that captures the essence of handwriting without the unnecessary extras".

== Gallery ==
Versions comparison of Freestyle Script:

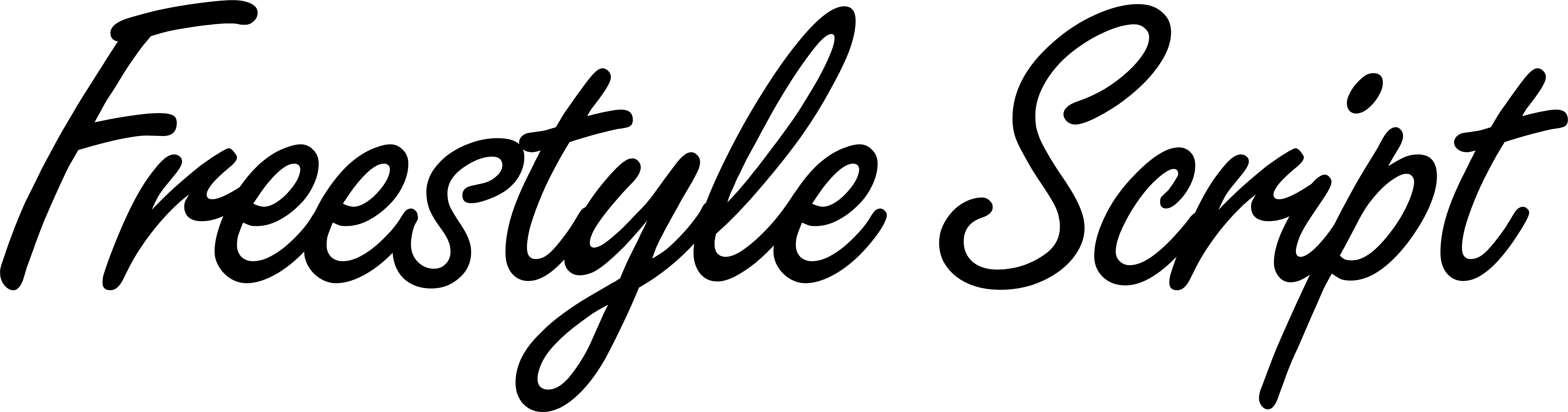
Freestyle Script Plain

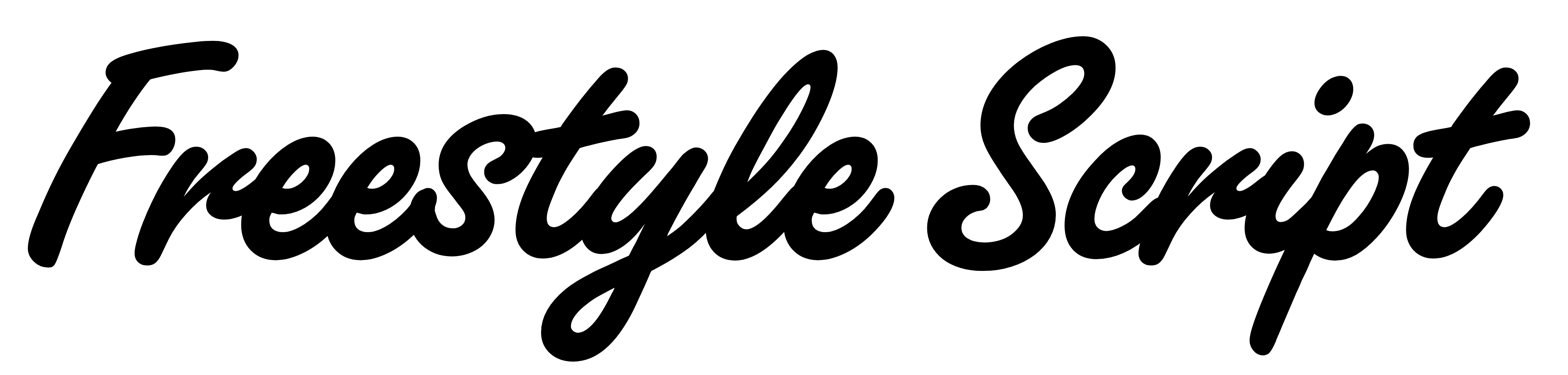
Freestyle Script Plain Bold

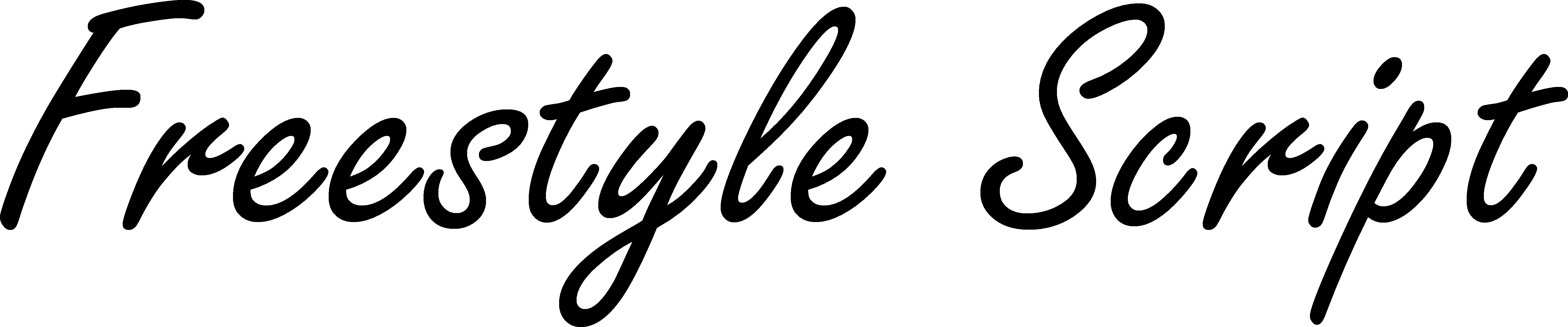
Freestyle Script Regular

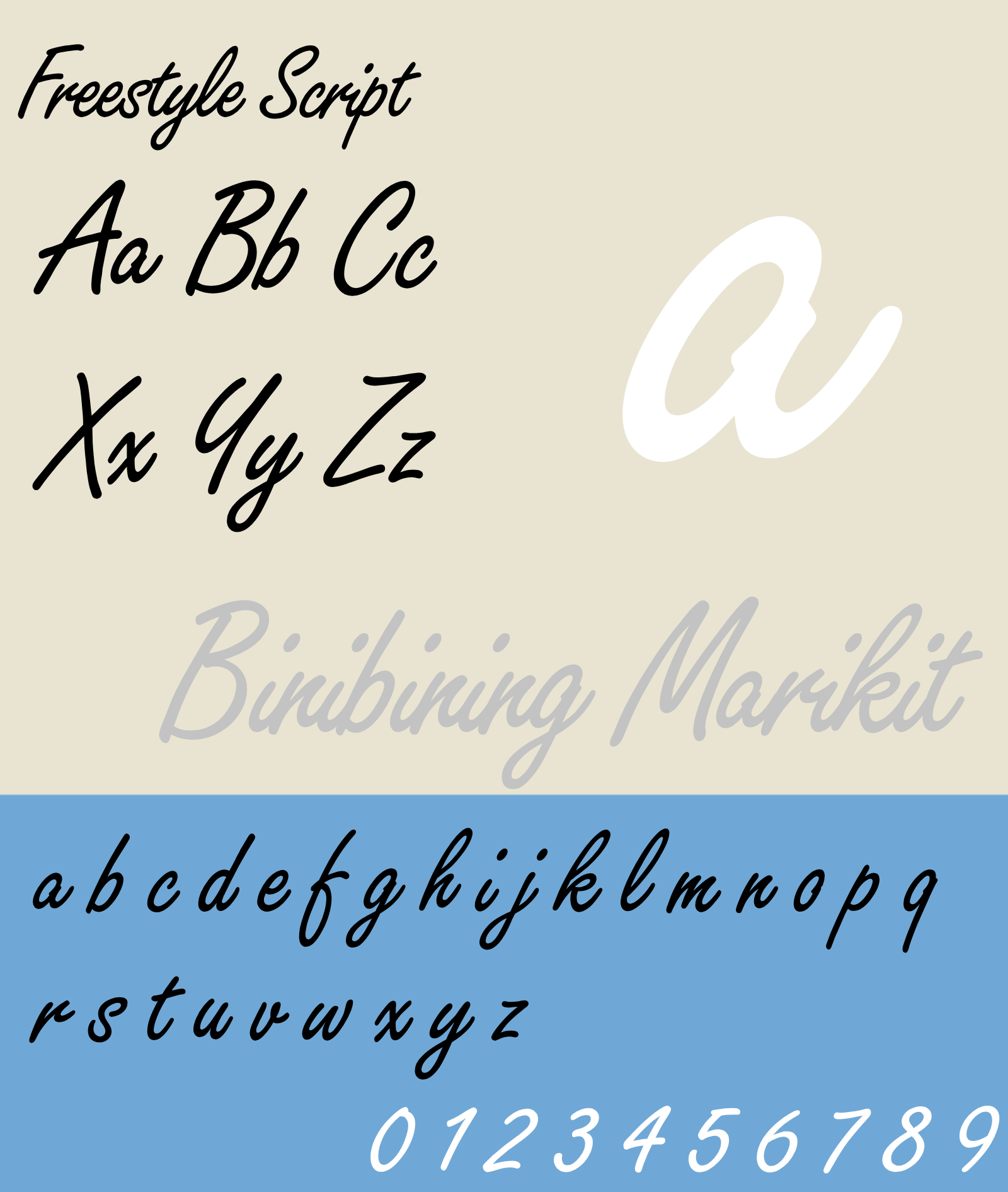
Freestyle Script Plain specimen

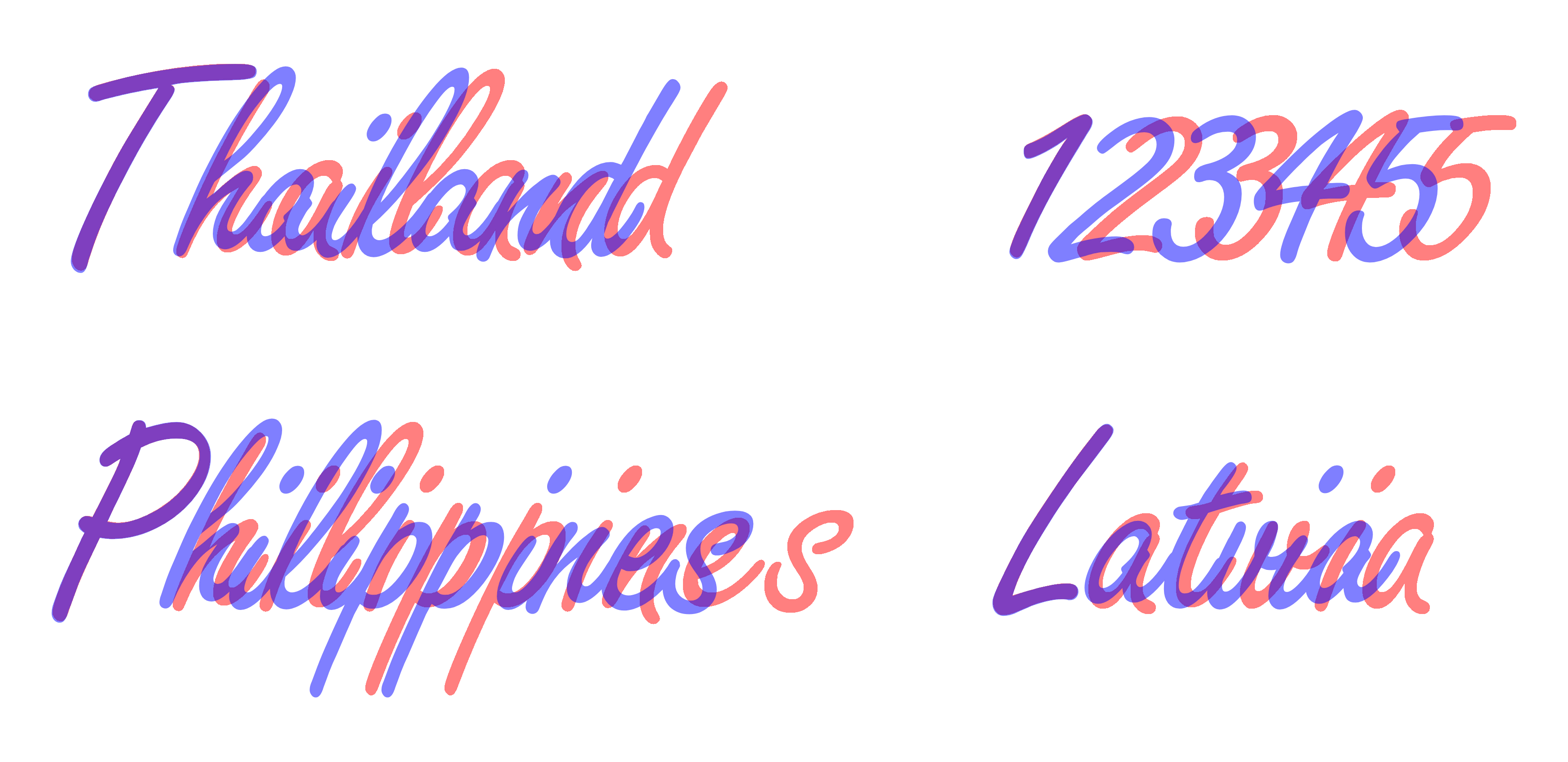
Further samples of comparison

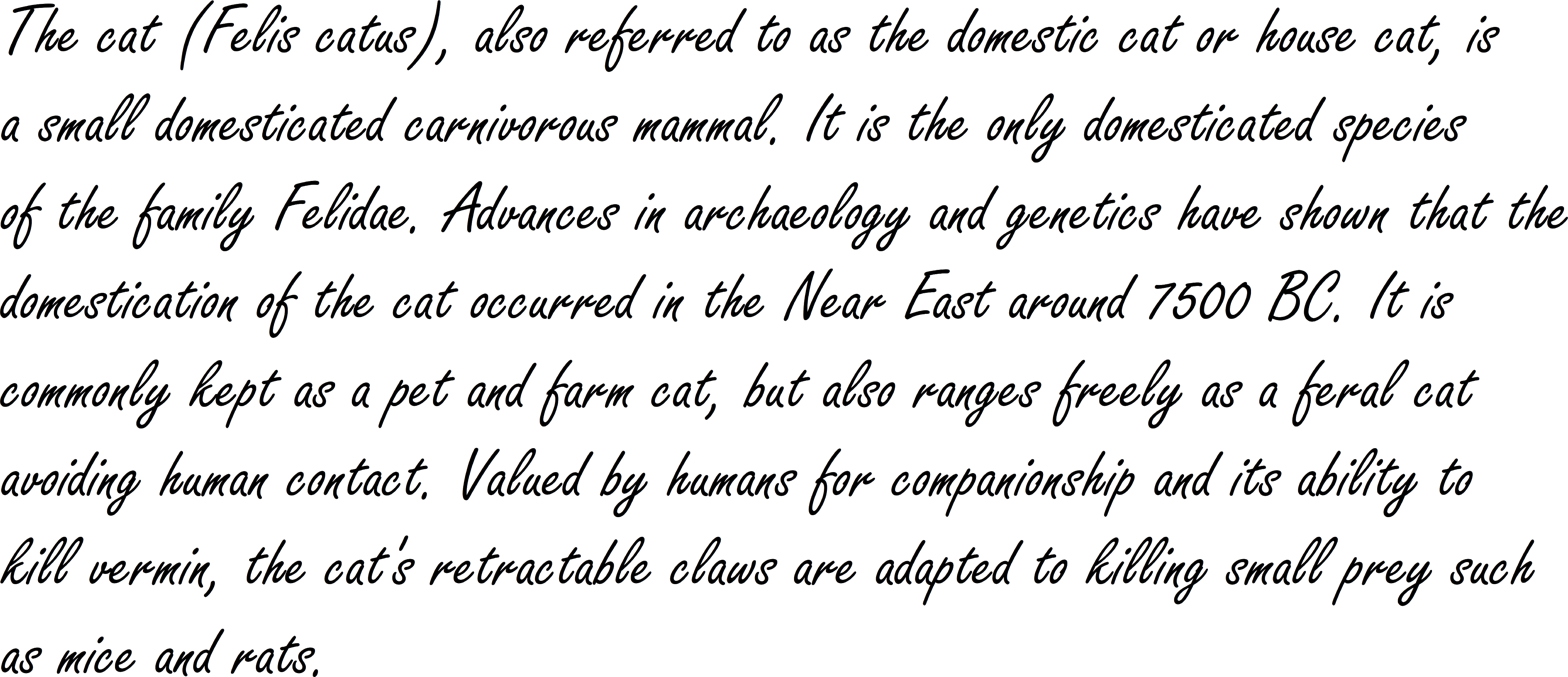

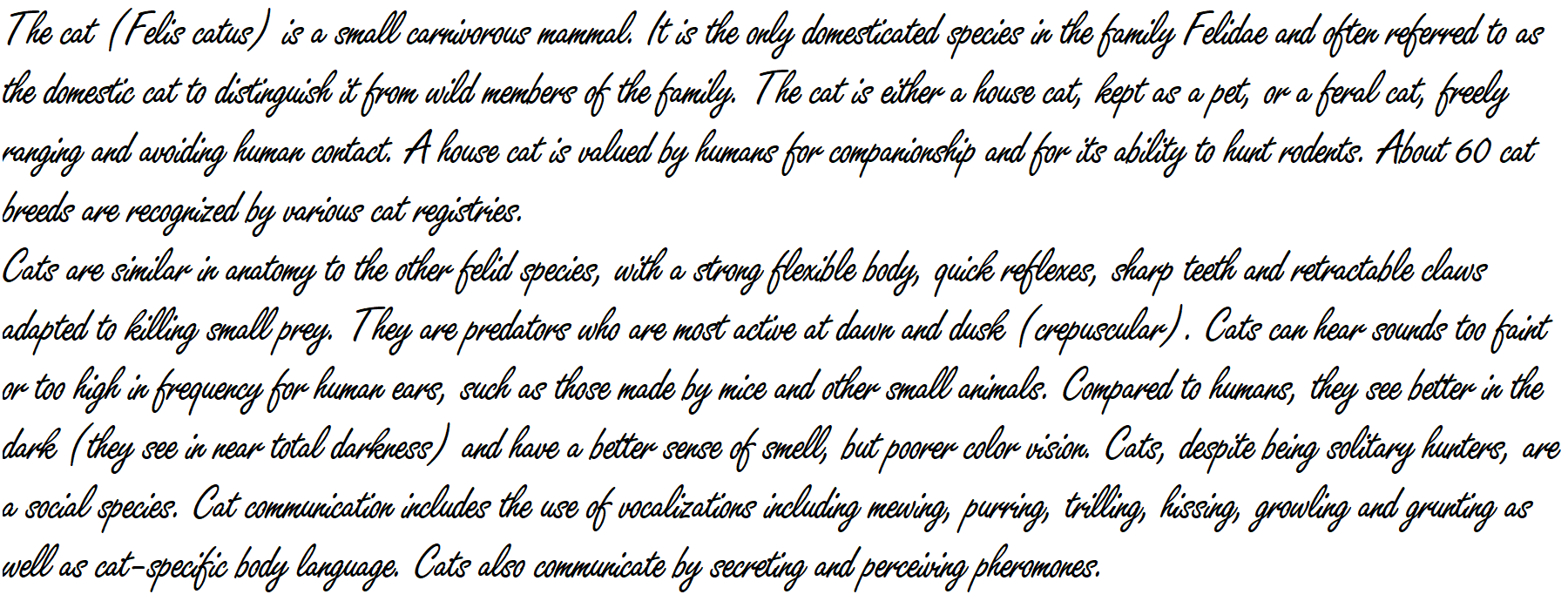
