= ITC Zapf Chancery =

Typeface

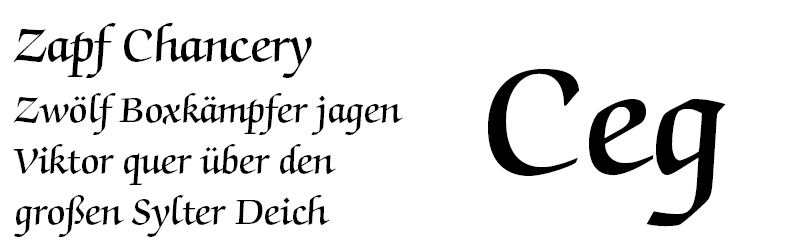
- Category: Script
- Designer: Hermann Zapf
- Foundry: ITC
- Date released: 1979

ITC Zapf Chancery is a family of script typefaces designed by the German type designer Hermann Zapf and marketed by the International Typeface Corporation. It is one of the three typefaces designed by Zapf that are shipped with computers running Apple's Mac OS. It is also one of the core PostScript fonts.

== History ==
Zapf Chancery was announced in 1979 in six styles from light to bold, the demibold and bold styles being released without italics. It was named after the English name for a Renaissance handwriting style later adapted as an inspiration for early printing.

== Variants and similar typefaces ==
Like many typefaces of the period, imitations of Zapf Chancery were created for specific uses and by competing companies.

URW Chancery L by URW (Unternehmensberatung Rubow Weber—from the founders' names now retitled URW++) provides a GPL-ed clone of the font. An extended version TeX Gyre Chorus is another similar typeface based on the URW Chancery L font. This typeface is released in formats compatible with LaTeX as well as with modern OpenType compatible systems.

Monotype Corsiva
- Category: Script
- Designer: Patricia Saunders
- Foundry: Monotype

A popular lookalike design has been Monotype Corsiva, by Patricia Saunders at the Monotype Corporation. Monotype at the time created or licensed many lookalike typefaces for Microsoft software with identical metrics to popular fonts, including Century Gothic, Arial and Book Antiqua, also a Zapf knockoff. Zapf resigned from ATypI (Association Typographique Internationale) over what he viewed as its hypocritical attitude toward unauthorized copying by prominent ATypI members, specifically Monotype. However, a court case concluded that Corsiva was sufficiently separate as a design to avoid payment of damages, noting that while the fonts were "similar", "the typeface is based upon 15th and 16th Century calligraphic designs from Rome and Venice. In fact, Ms. Saunders' research and work done on creating Corsiva was televised on the BBC program, Landmarks."

== See also ==
- Zapfino
