= Giovanni Battista Palatino =

Italian calligrapher

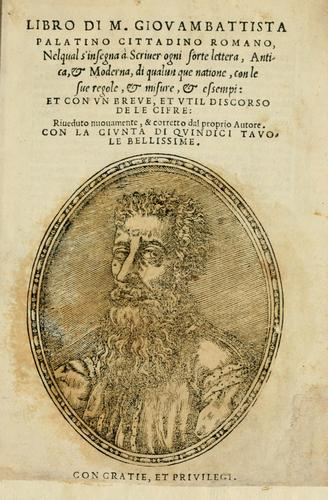
The title page of Libro nuovo d'imparare a scrivere

Giovanni Battista Palatino (c. 1515 - c. 1575), also known as Giambattista, was an Italian calligrapher. He was born in Rossano, Calabria, but moved to Rome as a young man. In 1538, Palatino acquired Roman citizenship, much to his pride. Palatino's Libro nuovo d'imparare a scrivere is the best-known Renaissance treatise on calligraphy. He dedicated it to the Academia dello sdegno (Academy of the Disdainful), of which he was secretary. As a calligrapher, Palatino was fascinated by ciphers and generally by the metamorphosis of the alphabet. The serif typeface designed by Hermann Zapf and released in 1948 was named after Giambattista Palatino.
