= Libertinus =

Typeface

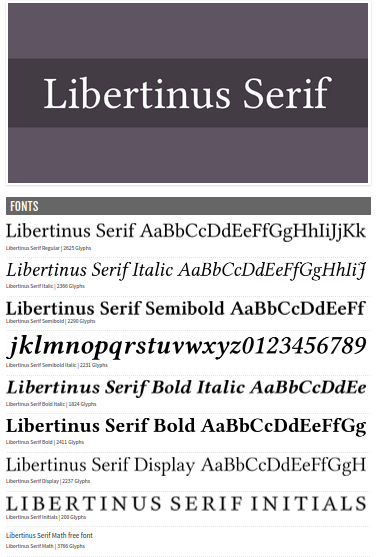
- Category: Serif
- Classification: Garalde old-style
- Date released: July 2, 2012; 14 years ago
- License: OFL 1.1
- Sample
- Website: github.com/alerque/libertinus
- Latest release version: 7.051
- Latest release date: September 26, 2024; 21 months ago

Libertinus Sans
- Category: Sans-serif
- Classification: Humanist
- Date released: July 2, 2012; 14 years ago
- License: OFL 1.1
- Sample
- Latest release version: 7.050
- Latest release date: September 21, 2024; 21 months ago

Libertinus is a typeface forked in 2012 from the Linux Libertine Open Fonts Project, which aims to create free and open alternatives to proprietary typefaces such as Times New Roman. It is licensed under the SIL Open Font License.

== Basic font information ==
The Libertinus Fonts project includes four main type families:

- Libertinus Serif: 6 serif typefaces cover three weights (Regular, Semibold, Bold) in each of two styles (Regular, Italic); originally forked from Linux Libertine.
- Libertinus Sans: 3 sans-serif typefaces cover Regular, a Bold weight, and an Italic style; originally forked from Linux Biolinum which was in turn based on Optima.
- Libertinus Mono: 1 monospace typeface derived from the serif family; originally forked from Linux Libertine Mono.
- Libertinus Math: 1 OpenType math typeface derived from the serif family with many extra glyphs and features for use in OpenType math-capable applications (such as LuaTeX, XeTeX, or MS Word 2007+).

Additionally included are 3 special-use families with a single typeface each:

- Libertinus Serif Display: A derivative of Libertinus Serif Regular optimized for display at large sizes.
- Libertinus Serif Initials: A derivative of Libertinus Serif with outlined variants of capital letter glyphs suitable for drop-caps or other decorations.
- Libertinus Keyboard: A derivative of Libertinus Sans with keyboard key outlines around each character suitable for use in technical documentation.

Libertinus development is currently hosted at Github. It is also distributed at CTAN and is included in the standard TeX distribution, TeXlive.

== Characteristics ==
Like Linux Libertine before it, Libertinus Serif is a proportional serif typeface inspired by 19th century book type and is intended as an alternative to the Times font family.

== History ==
The Libertinus font project began as a fork of the Linux Libertine and Linux Biolinum fonts. Libertinus was forked from the 5.3.0 (2012-07-02) release of Linux Libertine fonts. The original impetus was to add an OpenType math companion to the Libertine font families. Over time, it grew into a full-fledged fork addressing many of the bugs in the Libertine fonts.

== Derivative works ==
Stefan Peev forked the Libertinus Serif font to create the Common Serif font in 2022.

== See also ==
- Free software Unicode typefaces
- List of typefaces
- Unicode fonts
