= Harlow (typeface) =

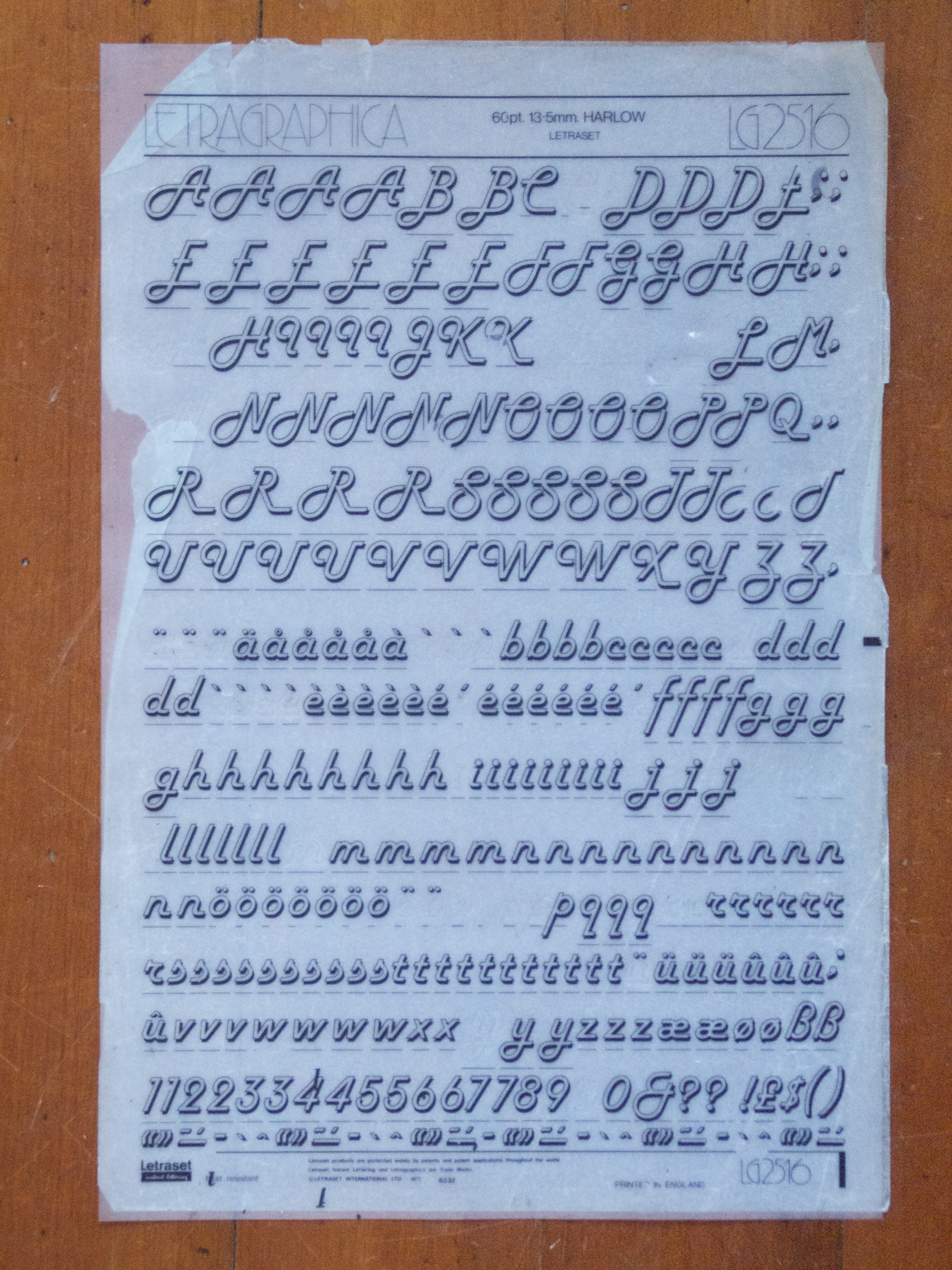
The shadowed weight of Harlow on a Letraset sheet.

Harlow is a typeface intended for display use. Designed by Colin Brignall and originally published by Letraset, it is inspired by lettering in the Streamline Moderne style of the 1930s and 1940s.

The solid weight, sometimes named Harlow Solid Italic, is included with Microsoft software such as Microsoft Office. A shadowed weight is sold commercially by ITC.
