= Phill Grimshaw =

Phill Grimshaw (1 February 1950 – 27 July 1998) was an English typeface designer and calligrapher who designed dozens of fonts for Letraset and the International Typeface Corporation (ITC) in the 1980s and 1990s.

== Biography ==
Gravura, a script typeface designed by Phill Grimshaw in 1995

Grimshaw was born on 1 February 1950 in Bolton. He studied art at Bolton College, where he was taught by the typographer Tony Forster, with whom he would later become close friends. Forster encouraged Grimshaw to apply to London's Royal College of Art (RCA). Grimshaw completed a master's degree between 1972 and 1975 at the RCA, where he met David Hockney and John Gorham. He returned to Lancashire after graduating from the RCA and opened a commercial lettering studio focusing on both typography and calligraphy. His calligraphic work was popular in the advertising industry; he produced work for the British Council, Marks & Spencer, Gale's, Littlewoods, Scottish & Newcastle, and BBC North.

Grimshaw's professional partnership with Colin Brignall began in the 1980s, when Brignall was the type director for Letraset, which produced sheets of typefaces for dry transfer. Grimshaw designed multiple typefaces for Letraset between 1986 and 1995, including Oberon (1986) and Hazel (1992). He continued collaborating with Brignall at the International Typeface Corporation (ITC), beginning with ITC Braganza (1996), which won a Type Directors Club Award. Other fonts he created for ITC include Obelisk (1996), Klepto (1996), Kendo (1997), and Noovo (1997). In total, he designed 44 complete typefaces for Letraset and ITC. Brignall called Grimshaw "one of the best display typeface designers of recent times".

Grimshaw died on 27 July 1998, aged 48, after a prolonged illness.
