= David Siegel (entrepreneur) =

American entrepreneur (born 1959)

- Born: 1959 (age 66–67); United States
- Education: University of Colorado, Stanford University
- Occupations: Entrepreneur, writer
- Known for: Early web designer

David Siegel (born 1959) is an American entrepreneur. Having started his career in typography, he became a leading web designer in the mid-1990s, then worked as a business consultant, and currently leads a nonprofit foundation and a start-up in London cryptocurrency. Siegel is also the author of four books exploring the intersection of management and technology.

== Education ==
David Siegel received an undergraduate degree in mathematics from the University of Colorado at Boulder. In 1985, he earned a master's degree in digital typography from Stanford University, under Donald Knuth and Charles Bigelow. His master's project was to digitize Hermann Zapf's typeface AMS Euler using METAFONT; he was also initially involved in the production of Zapfino.

== Career ==
Siegel's first job was with Pixar, whose mission at the time was to build and sell image computers. After one year, he left and started two companies in the next ten years. During this period he designed several retail typefaces.

Among the first wave of designers to turn their attention to the web, Siegel began designing web sites in 1994, and in 1995 he started Studio Verso, a web design agency in San Francisco. He became noted for his web award site named High Five, where he wrote a column reviewing websites for their design excellence. On his personal site he also ran a how-to section called Web Wonk, which offered instruction in web design, including the basics of color, typography, layout, and images.

Siegel's first book, Creating Killer Web Sites, was published in 1996 (revised second edition 1997) and became an international bestseller.

Siegel's approach to 'Third-generation Site Design', as promoted on his sites and in his book, involved bending the structural properties of the HTML markup language for presentational ends. This approach consolidated a school of web design that favoured visually oriented aesthetics over ideals of usability as championed by Jakob Nielsen. In the absence of browser support for the still gestating Cascading Style Sheets (CSS) presentation language (which he influenced and encouraged), he recommended the use of invisible single-pixel GIFs as spacers for visual control, and table-based layouts.

Siegel reconsidered these recommendations in 1997, denouncing the single-pixel GIF and table-based layouts as ‘hacks’ and expressing optimism that advances in CSS support were going to bridge the divide between structure and presentation.

Having acquired a reputation as the "father of web design," Siegel shifted his business activities from web design to web strategy consulting, focusing his second book, Secrets of Successful Web Sites on web project management.

His third book, Futurize your Enterprise, appeared in 1999 and advises businesses to restructure their companies and websites around their internet-empowered customers.

In 2010 Siegel's fourth book came out, Pull, which discusses the impact of the Semantic Web, defined in unusually broad terms, on business.

In recent years, Siegel has been pursuing the project of an open-source platform named Pillar, which would enable users to retain control of their personal information using the blockchain. Having failed to raise venture capital for his company 20|30, he resolved to raise the money from prospective users of the platform, offering 560 million tokens via an initial coin offering in 2017. The Pillar project raised over $21 million in Ether and currently operates in London. He is also the Founder of 2030.

== Bibliography ==
- Creating Killer Web Sites, first published in 1996 (revised second edition 1997).
- Secrets of Successful Web Sites on web project management (1997).
- Futurize your Enterprise, restructure companies and websites around their internet-empowered customers (1999).
- Pull, the impact of the Semantic Web (2010).
