= Choco Cooky =

Sans-serif typeface from Samsung

Choco cooky
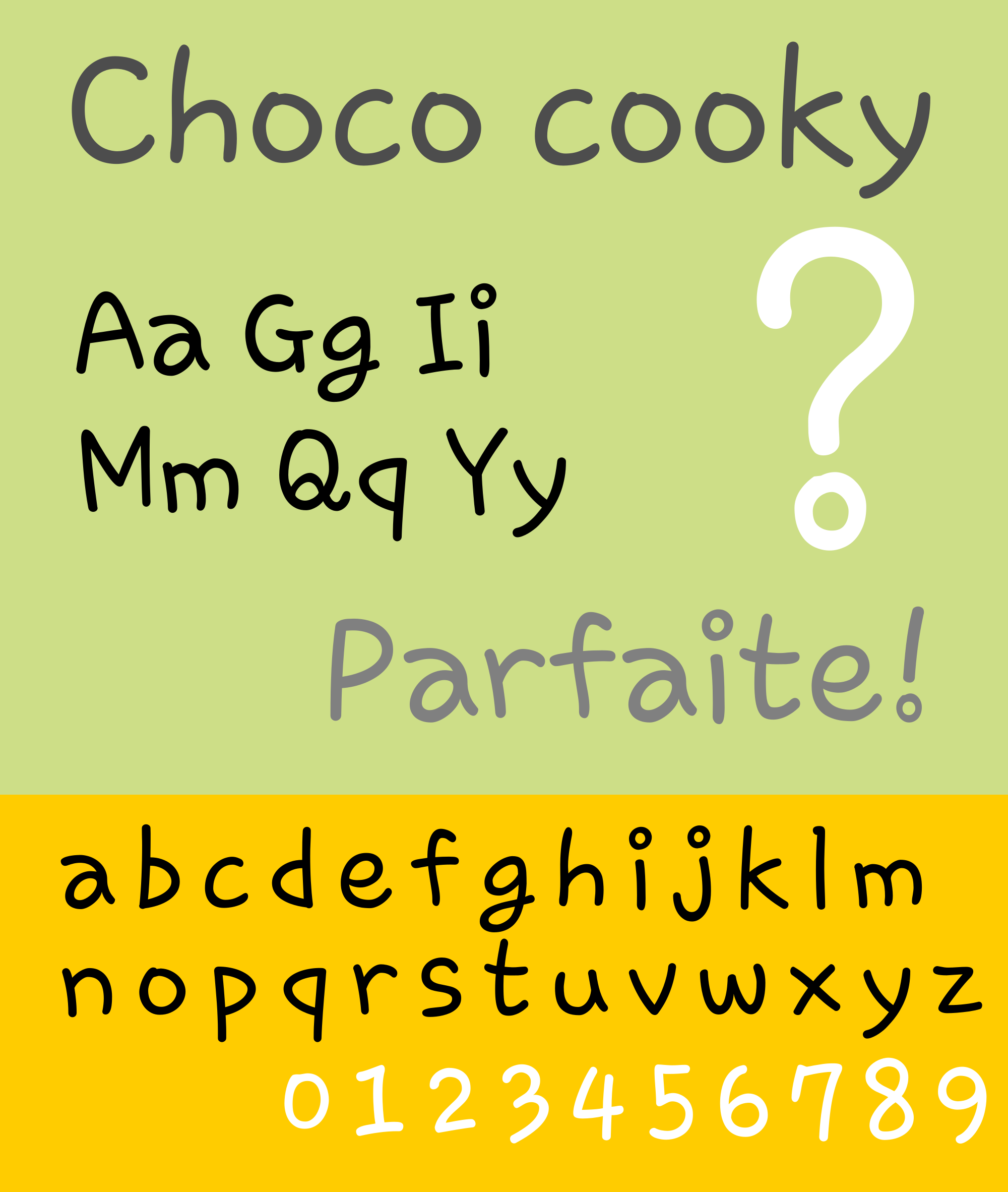
- Category: Script
- Designer: YoonDesign Inc.
- Foundry: Samsung Electronics
- Date released: 2006

Choco cooky or Cre ChocoCookie (Korean: Cre초코쿠키) is a casual script typeface designed by YoonDesign with a handwriting style. The font is used by Samsung Electronics in its mobile phone products, shipping pre-installed in almost all its phones and tablets. The font first appeared in South Korean Anycall models in about 2007. Choco cooky has been seen as a comical and playful font, and has been compared to Microsoft's well-known Comic Sans font.

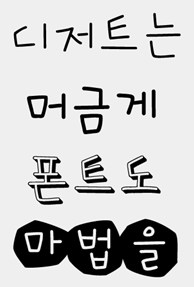
Cre ChocoCookie L, M, MM and C variants showing Korean text

Choco cooky as seen on Samsung phones is the Medium weight version of Cre ChocoCookie. The family also includes Light, Marshmallow (MM) and Chocolate Chip (C). A pixel style version of the font was also released by YoonDesign in 2023.

== See also ==
- ITC Kristen
