= POP (typeface) =

Typeface designed to effect the look of handwritten Kanji

POP (Point of Purchase; Japanese: ポップ体) is a mono-weight typeface for the Japanese kanji writing system. It is similar to both sans-serif and script-based typefaces in the Latin alphabet. The POP typeface is designed to effect the look of handwritten Kanji, as though produced by a felt-tip marker. Its loose, casual structure makes it similar to casual scripts in the Latin alphabet.

A common misconception is to associate POP with HGSoeiKakupoptai (HG創英角ﾎﾟｯﾌﾟ体), but it is only one of many types of casual script fonts produced in Japan, even from the font foundry Soei (創英企画). Its popularity came from being distributed with Japanese version of Microsoft Office 2000, and it was also sold by Ricoh under TrueTypeWorld ValueFontD2.
