= Palatino =

Serif typeface

- Category: Serif
- Classification: Old-style
- Designer: Hermann Zapf
- Foundry: Stempel; Linotype
- Date created: 1948
- Date released: 1949
- Variations: Palatino Nova; Palatino Sans

Palatino is an old-style serif typeface designed by Hermann Zapf, initially released in 1949 by the Stempel foundry and later by other companies, most notably the Mergenthaler Linotype Company. (Note: The date is sometimes given as 1948, when Zapf was working on drawing it. This article follows Bringhurst's and Kelly's information of a 1949 release date. 1950 has also sometimes been given as the release date.) Palatino is optimised for legibility with open counters, balanced proportions, moderate stroke contrast and flared serifs.

== Background ==
Named after the 16th-century Italian master of calligraphy Giambattista Palatino, Palatino is based on the humanist types of the Italian Renaissance, which mirror the letters formed by a broad nib pen reflecting Zapf's expertise as a calligrapher. Its capital 'Y' is in the unusual 'palm Y' style, inspired by the Greek letter upsilon, a trait found in some of the earliest versions of the letter such as that of Aldus Manutius.

Unlike most Renaissance typeface revivals, which tend to have delicate proportions such as a low x-height (short lower-case letters and longer ascenders and descenders), Palatino has larger proportions, increasing legibility. Palatino was particularly intended as a design for trade or 'jobbing' use, such as headings, advertisements and display printing, and was created with a solid, wide structure and wide apertures that could appear clearly on poor-quality paper, when read at a distance or printed at small sizes.

Palatino is one of several related typefaces by Zapf, which Stempel marketed as an "extended family". The group includes Palatino, Sistina, Michelangelo, and Aldus; Zapf's biographer Jerry Kelly describes them as forming "the largest type family based on classic renaissance forms at the time." These designs were strongly influenced by Italian Renaissance letter forms and Roman square capitals, although Zapf was unable to visit Italy until after he had finished the Palatino roman. Palatino rapidly became popular for book body text use, overshadowing the narrower and lighter Aldus, which Zapf had designed for this role. It has been described as one of the ten most used serif typefaces. Since Palatino was not originally designed for body text, some of its characters were intended to stand out with quirky, calligraphic design features, and Zapf later redesigned them with more sober alternates, which have become the norm on most digital versions.

Linotype licensed Palatino to Adobe and Apple who incorporated it into the PostScript digital printing technology as a standard font. This guaranteed its importance in digital and desktop publishing and made it (or a variant of it) a preinstalled font on most computers. As with many popular fonts, knockoff designs and rereleases under different names are common. Zapf retained an interest in the design, and continued to collaborate on new versions into his eighties.

== Palatino family ==
=== Palatino ===
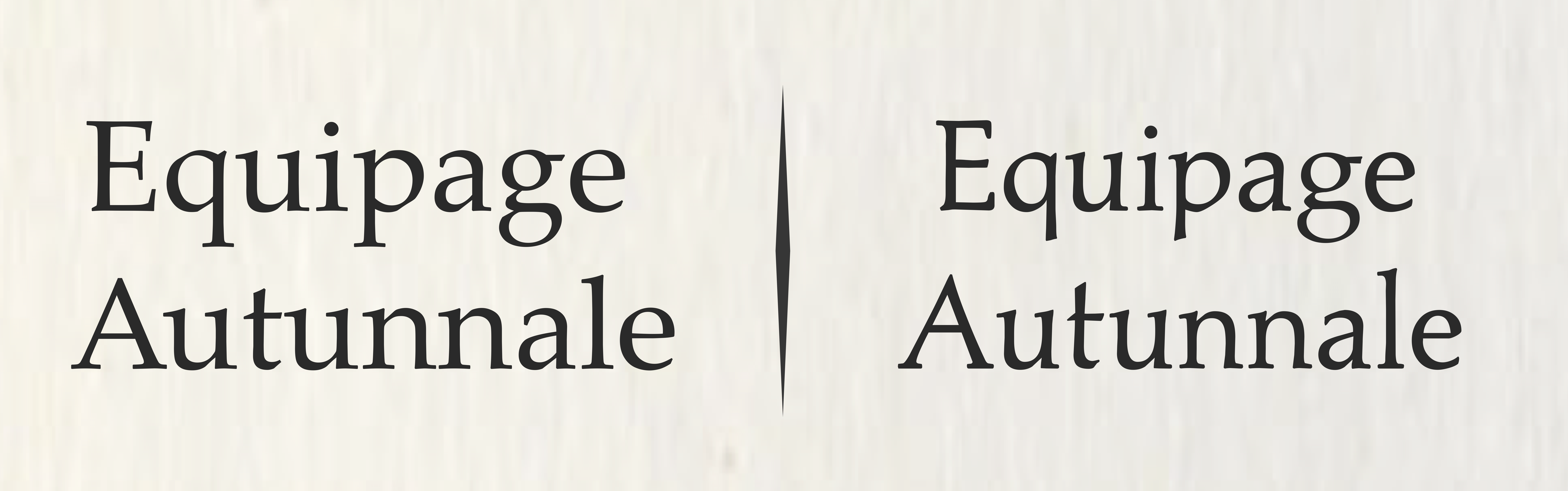
Softmaker's digitisation of Palatino, Palazzo Original (right), shows some original features changed in the later digitisations endorsed by Zapf, including a more organic design and detail differences such as a different 'E', 'p', 'q' and 't'.

Palatino itself, as previously noted, has a solid structure, intended to read clearly on poor-quality paper and printing. Zapf's friend Alexander Lawson wrote that "the open counters that make Palatino such a legible letter were provided to overcome a then current printing problem in Germany, poor-quality paper. The weight of the type was also thickened beyond that of a normal roman in order to adapt to the lithographic and gravure printing processes of that period. Zapf has steadily maintained that he did not create Palatino as a book type but rather as a commercial face."

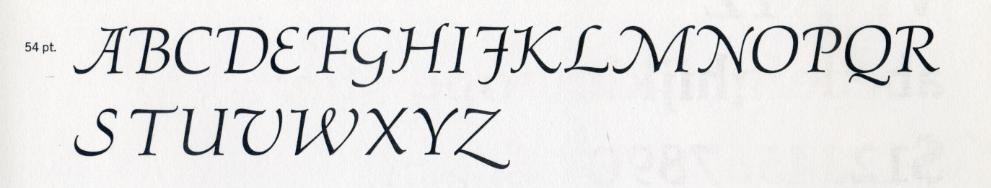
The italic swash capitals of Palatino from an American metal type specimen sheet

Due to Palatino's increasing popularity in body text, multiple versions have been released for the changing technologies of handsetting, hot metal typesetting, phototypesetting and digital font design. Later versions often have regularised details such as a lower 't' and foot serifs on 'p' and 'q'. The italic in particular has gone through several redesigns, with the original for hand-set foundry type being distinctly narrow, the version for the Linotype machine distinctly wide to enable duplexing with the roman, and the versions for subsequent photosetting and digital technologies being in between the two extremes. Hutner and Kelly have described Palatino as "distinctly modern... a modern type not copied from any specific early model."

Palatino's italic in metal type included a set of swash capitals. These have not been found in digitisations, although digitisations of Zapf's Renaissance Antiqua design (discussed below) do include a (slightly different) set. Later versions alter the descenders on many letters; Zapf originally had to keep these short to fit on the German common line standard, optimised for blackletter typefaces; later versions escape this restriction.

=== Aldus ===
Linotype Aldus
- Category: Serif
- Classification: Old style
- Designer: Hermann Zapf
- Foundry: Linotype
- Date created: 1954
- Trademark: Linotype

Palatino and Aldus compared in digital versions. The differences are quite subtle.

Aldus is an old-style serif design, popular for use in book printing. Compared to Palatino, released some years earlier, it has a more condensed design lighter in colour, more graceful and refined and better suited to the high average quality of book printing. Aldus has a non-kerning roman and italic f, allowing the typographer to avoid ligatures. It appeared in the D. Stempel AG catalog in 1954 and Zapf used it to set his own Manuale Typographicum, a history of letter design.

Aldus is named for the Venetian Renaissance printer Aldus Manutius. The decision annoyed Zapf (who preferred the name "Palatino Book") since it bears little direct resemblance to Aldus's typefaces.

Like Palatino, an upgraded digitisation, Aldus Nova, has been released by Linotype.

=== Michelangelo ===
A set of titling capitals, based on Roman square capitals. The design has a 'U' with a foot serif at bottom right, a 'double-V'-style 'W' with four top terminals and a 'palm Y' similar to that on Palatino, inspired by the Greek letter upsilon. It was renamed "Palatino Titling" in the Palatino nova release (see below), since the rights to the name were held by Berthold who also published a digitisation.

=== Sistina ===
A slightly bolder set of titling capitals than Michaelangelo on the same basic structure. It was originally named 'Aurelia Titling' after the Roman road named Via Aurelia; Zapf would later use the name for another separate font. The Palatino nova version (see below) is renamed "Palatino Imperial" and has small capitals as a lower case. It was created following an artistically productive 1950 visit to Italy, which Zapf had been unable to visit before. Zapf was very interested in the quality of Italian art and lettering, and his sketches of stonecarving in Florence also inspired the humanist sans-serif Optima.

=== Kompakt ===
An ultra-bold display type, with a slight slope but roman rather than italic letter forms. Unlike Palatino, it is very unlike the style of roman type printing used during the Renaissance, which did not use bold type.

=== Zapf Renaissance Antiqua (1984–1986) ===
Not part of Stempel's metal Palatino family, Zapf Renaissance Antiqua is a separate interpretation by Zapf of the same Renaissance models dating to 1984–1986, initially created for Scangraphic and later digitised and sold by Linotype along with Palatino. Compared to Palatino, Zapf Renaissance Antiqua has greater stroke contrast, which carries through to the sharp serifs and wedge-like punctuation marks, but it also features smoother transitions between thick and thin strokes. It is also notable for including a full set of swash letterforms, with as many as five variants of each lowercase letter – something not included on digital versions of Palatino. According to Linotype the currently available digitisation is based on the versions prepared by Scangraphic for display use, with tight spacing and striking contrasts in stroke weight. A version marketed under the name “Zapf Renaissance Antiqua SB” contains these same high-contrast letterforms, but with looser spacing for running text. However, some typographers have criticized the poor quality of the spacing in all available digitizations, attributing it to an inaccurate conversion from its original, proprietary digital format into PostScript.

== Variants and similar typefaces ==
=== Digitisations ===
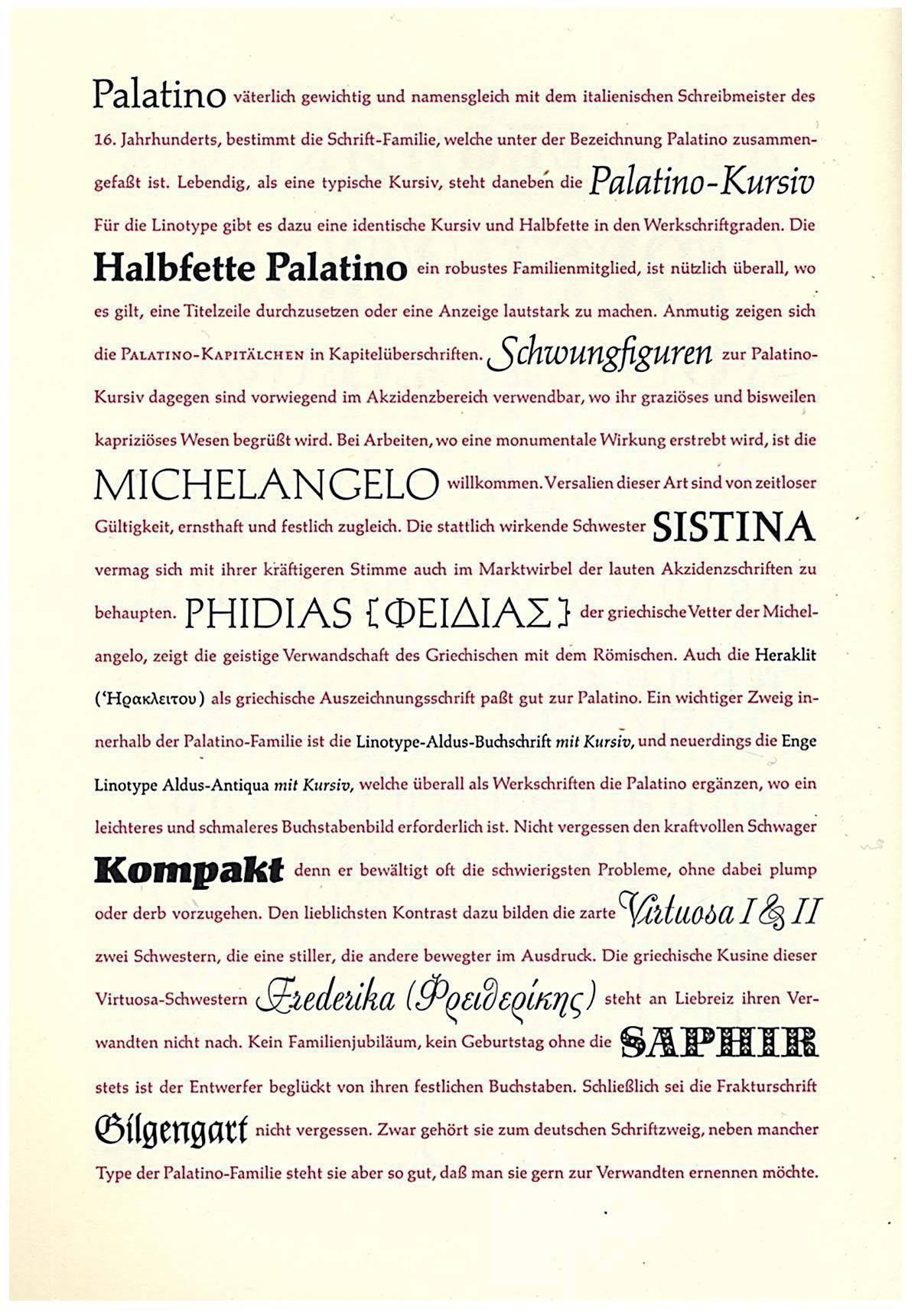
A 1953 specimen of Palatino's "extended family", showing the range of fonts Stempel considered complementary to it. Many have little to do with Palatino itself. (Note: Those listed are Palatino in roman, italic with swash capitals, small caps and bold, Michaelangelo, Sistina, the Greek titling Phidias (complementary in weight to Michaelangelo), Aldus and the Greek face Heraklit (shown only at text size) and the stylistically unrelated display face Kompakt ('a strong brother-in-law'), the scripts Virtuosa and Frederika, the decorated Saphir and the blackletter Gilgenart.)

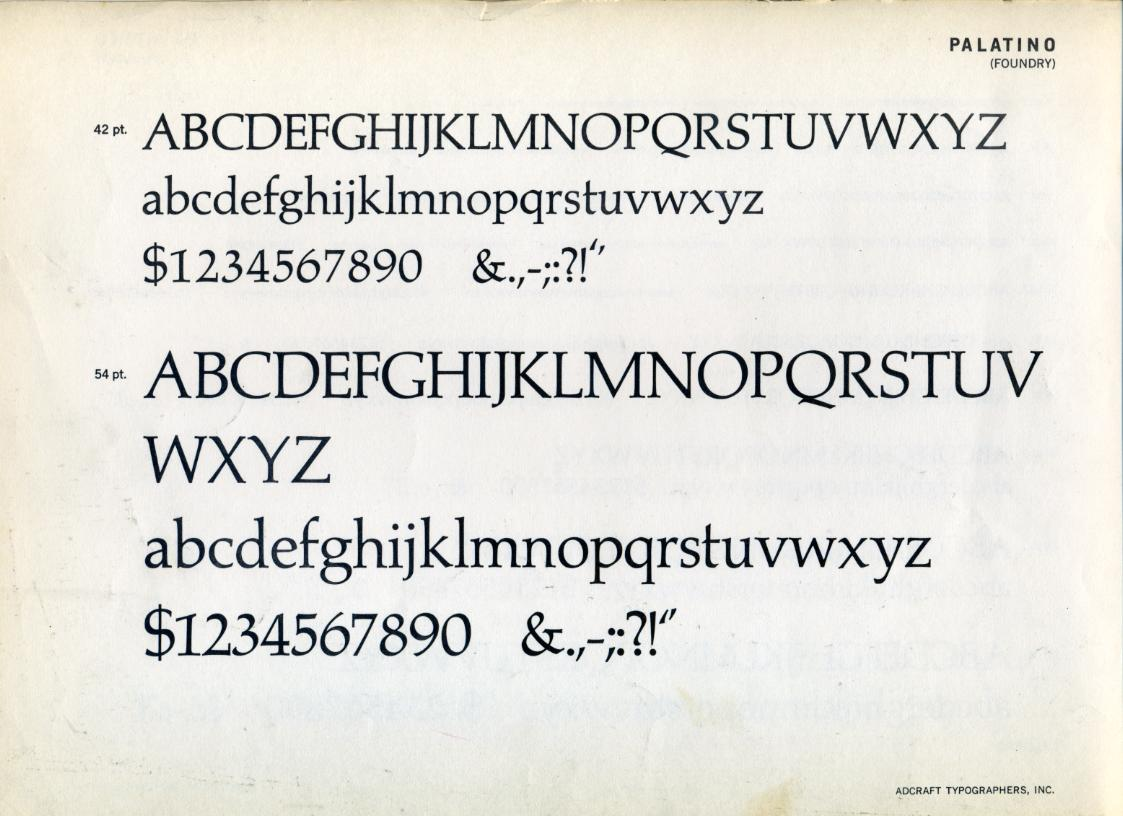
The roman form of Palatino from an American metal type specimen sheet. This design shows the alternate characters used on later releases.

Palatino's early digitisation intended for PostScript use is very widely used or cloned. Later Palatino digitisations have different features and spacing. In 1999, Zapf revised Palatino for Linotype and Microsoft, called Palatino Linotype. The revised family incorporated extended Latin, Greek, and Cyrillic character sets. Linotype released a more complex redesign named Palatino Nova, together with digitisations of some of Zapf's other Renaissance-inspired designs and Aldus. Zapf also created a matching Palatino Sans and Palatino Sans Informal design in 2006.

=== Palatino Linotype ===
Palatino Linotype is the version of the Palatino family included with modern versions of Microsoft software. It incorporates extended Latin, Greek, Cyrillic characters, as well as currency signs, subscripts and superscripts, and fractions. The family includes roman and italic in text and bold weights.

Palatino Linotype was notable as being the first western OpenType font that Microsoft shipped; Palatino Linotype was bundled with Windows 2000. The OpenType version showcased some (then new) alternate features, including ligatures, true small caps, proportional and tabular figures, text figures and a variety of special alternate characters, such as the swash Capital Qu combination. This marks it out from earlier digitisations such as the OS X system version, which do not include ligatures such as Th and Qu. On release it was one of the few fonts to incorporate an interrobang.

=== Palatino Nova ===
Palatino Nova is a redesigned version of Palatino, by Hermann Zapf and Akira Kobayashi. This Palatino Nova typeface family includes roman and italics in the light, text, medium, and bold weights, a new release of Aldus and versions of Michelangelo and Sistina under the name of "Palatino Titling" and "Palatino Imperial".

The font family was premiered on November 24, 2005, the same day as Hermann Zapf's 87th birthday celebration. A new digitisation of Aldus named Aldus nova was created at the same time.

=== Palatino Sans ===
Palatino Sans is a sans-serif design with stroke width modulation, resembling Zapf's classic design Optima but with a softer, more organic feel. Unlike the serifed counterpart, the Sans families do not have full Greek or Cyrillic characters. Reviewing it for Typographica on release, font designer Hrant Papazian commented:

The confluence of competence, freedom and kiai... evident in Palatino Sans is breathtaking. The sober organicity, the bravado of the raised 'r', the confident flair of the italic; all done before, but never in such a usable, contemporary whole.

==== Palatino Sans Informal ====
Palatino Sans Informal incorporates informal characteristics to the Palatino Sans, such as asymmetrical A, K, N, W, X, Y, w.

=== Palatino Arabic ===
It is a family designed by Lebanese designer Nadine Chahine and Hermann Zapf. The design is based on the Al-Ahram typeface designed by Zapf in 1956 but reworked and modified to fit the Palatino Nova family. The design is Naskh in style but with a strong influence of Thuluth style.

This family only comes in 1 font, with the Latin characters based on Palatino Nova Regular. It supports basic Latin, Arabic, Persian, and Urdu scripts. Chahine also created a version of Zapf's Zapfino.

=== Palatino eText (2013) ===
It is a family designed by Toshi Omagari of Monotype Imaging, optimised for on-screen use. It includes a larger x-height and wider spacing. It is the standard four-font family, with bolds and italics.

== Palatino clones ==
As one of the most iconic typefaces of the twentieth century, derivative designs based on Palatino were rapidly developed, taking advantage of the lack of practical copyright and the easy copying possible in the phototypesetting font market of the 1960s and 70s onwards. Many of these are almost indistinguishable from Palatino, and some even had Zapf's involvement as a consultant.

=== Palazzo Original ===
Softmaker's clone of Palatino, Palazzo Original, is unique for being based on the original metal type of Palatino: as a result, it contains many design features not seen in the digital versions of Palatino endorsed by Zapf and most clones. These include a 'p' and 'q' without foot serif and no serif on the centre stroke of the 'E' and 'F', as well as a slightly more delicate design with a lower x-height. It has also been released as Marathon Serial without italics.

=== PostScript clones ===
A comparison of Linotype Palatino, Monotype Book Antiqua, and Unternehmensberatung Rubow Weber (URW) Palladio L.

Most modern Palatino clones are set to match the spacing and design of the PostScript version of Palatino that was a standard font in early digital publishing. In the Bitstream font collection, the Palatino equivalent is called "Zapf Calligraphic".

URW++ sells its version as "URW Palladio L". A version of this font was later released by URW under a free and open-source licence as part of the Ghostscript project to develop an open-source alternative to PostScript. As a result, it (or a derivative) is used by much open-source software such as R as a system font. Palladio, however, lacks the subtle stroke modulation and rounded corners which can be found for example in Palatino Linotype.

==== Book Antiqua ====
One of the best-known Palatino PostScript clones is "Book Antiqua" (originally by Monotype), distributed with much Microsoft software, beginning with Microsoft Windows. It is one of many clone PostScript typefaces distributed by Microsoft and Monotype around this time, including Arial (similar to Helvetica), Century Gothic (ITC Avant Garde) and Bookman Old Style (ITC Bookman). Book Antiqua resembles Palatino extremely closely and is almost indistinguishable from the original apart from a few detail differences. ("Antiqua" is another word for the "Roman" style of typefaces that Palatino is based on, as opposed to blackletter. The genre, inspired by Italian traditions of handwriting and calligraphy, has been a dominant influence on most typefaces and lettering created in the Western world since the Renaissance.)

In 1993, Zapf resigned from l'Association Typographique Internationale (ATypI) over what he viewed as its hypocritical attitude toward unauthorized copying by prominent ATypI members (namely Monotype). In the United States, the abstract design of a typeface is not protected by copyright, and can be imitated freely (unless the typeface is protected by a design patent, which is of much more limited duration and rarely applied for). Copyright protection is available for the representation of a typeface in software (a computer font), and the names of typefaces can be protected by trademark.

Microsoft has since licensed and distributes Linotype's version of Zapf's original design called Palatino Linotype in all versions of Windows since Windows 2000. During the Palatino Linotype development process, Zapf and Linotype requested that Microsoft cease to include Book Antiqua with Office, but Microsoft concluded that this was impossible as too many documents had already been created using it. A custom version of Book Antiqua was created by Monotype as a corporate font for the Parliament of the UK.

=== Free and open-source versions and derivatives ===
The first legal free version of Palatino was URW Palladio L. The open-source community greatly extended the character sets of the fonts and releases new, updated versions under new names.

- FPL Neu is a typeface based on URW Palladio L font. It has both text figures and lining figures. It is available both in Type 1 format and OpenType format.
- TeX Gyre Pagella is another similar typeface based on the URW Palladio L font. Pagella includes accents for European languages as well as glyphs for a few non-European languages. This typeface is released in formats compatible with LaTeX as well as with modern OpenType compatible systems. It is a part of the TeX Gyre project to make updated, expanded, OpenType versions of URW's open-source fonts.
- Domitian is a typeface based on URW Palladio L font released recently in 2020. It was meant to be a drop in of Adobe Palatino, and extends more characters on top of Palladio.

Asana Math is an OpenType mathematical font designed to look like Palatino (so that math can visually match the text). It is based on the Type 1 pxfonts by Young Ryu.

== Awards ==
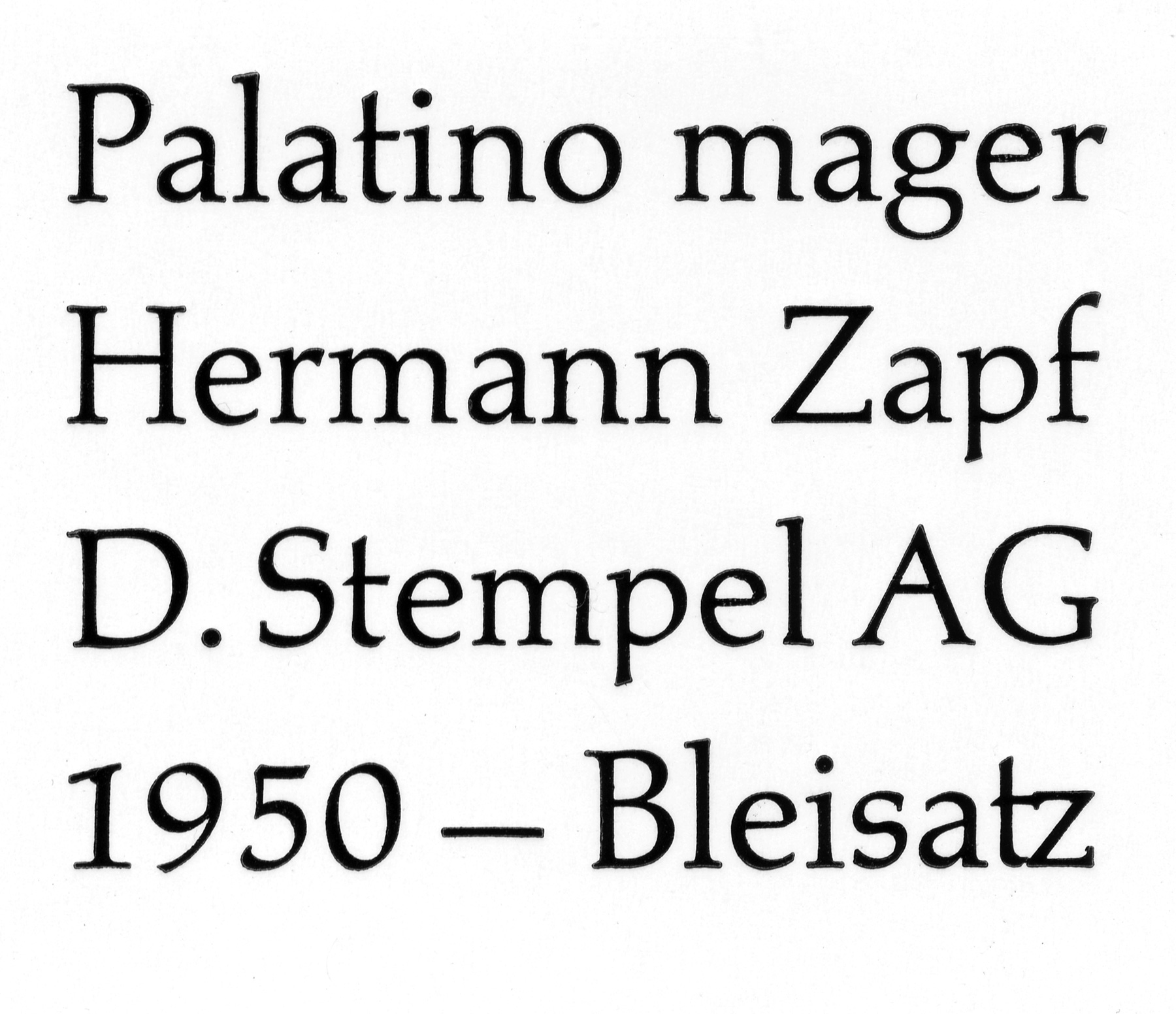
Palatino in letterpress

Palatino Sans and Palatino Sans Informal won Type Directors Club Type Design Competition 2007 award under Type System / Superfamily category.

Palatino Arabic won 2008 Type Directors Club TDC2 2008 award under Text / Type Family category.

== See also ==
The Aldine type of the Italian renaissance is one of the most influential typefaces in history. Copies based in it made by printers in Paris from the 1530s onwards by engravers such as Claude Garamond became the main style of type used in Europe, and influenced most successive type styles such as those of the Dutch renaissance. Other Aldine roman-influenced revivals include:

- Bembo by Monotype (1929), very popular in book printing.
- Dante designed by Giovanni Mardersteig and also released by Monotype.
- Minion by Robert Slimbach of Adobe Systems.
- Requiem by Jonathan Hoefler.
