= AMS Euler =

- Category: Script
- Designers: Hermann Zapf; Donald Knuth
- Foundry: AMS
- Date released: 1983
- Sample

AMS Euler is an upright cursive typeface, commissioned by the American Mathematical Society (AMS) and designed and created by Hermann Zapf with the assistance of Donald Knuth and his Stanford graduate students. It tries to emulate a mathematician's style of handwriting mathematical entities on a blackboard, which is upright rather than italic. It blends very well with other typefaces made by Hermann Zapf, such as Palatino, Aldus and Melior, but very badly with the default TeX font Computer Modern. All the alphabets were implemented with the computer-assisted design system Metafont developed by Knuth. Zapf designed and drew the Euler alphabets in 1980–81 and provided critique and advice of digital proofs in 1983 and later. The typeface family is copyright by American Mathematical Society, 1983. Euler Metafont development was done by Stanford computer science and/or digital typography students; first Scott Kim, then Carol Twombly and Daniel Mills, and finally David Siegel, all assisted by John Hobby. Siegel finished the Metafont Euler digitization project as his M.S. thesis in 1985.

The AMS Euler typeface is named after Leonhard Euler.

First implemented in METAFONT, AMS Euler was first used in the book Concrete Mathematics, which was co-authored by Knuth and dedicated to Euler. This volume also saw the debut of Knuth's Concrete Roman font, designed to complement AMS Euler. The Euler Metafont format fonts were converted to PostScript Type 1 font format by the efforts of several people, including Berthold Horn at Y&Y, Barry Smith at Bluesky Research, and Henry Pinkham and Ian Morrison at Projective Solutions. It is now also available in TrueType format.

== Reshaping Euler ==
Equations written in AMS Euler.

In 2009, AMS released version 3.0 of AMS fonts, in which Hermann Zapf reshaped many of the Euler glyphs, with implementation and assistance from Hans Hagen, Taco Hoekwater, and Volker RW Schaa.

The updated version 3.0 was presented to Donald Knuth on his 70th birthday, January 10, 2008.

These updates were designed to work with the metrics for version 2.2, so no changes to the .tfm files were needed. Since the updates were made directly to the Type 1 files, the (incompatible) Metafont sources have been removed from the distribution.

The reshaped version has been released under the OFL.

Neo Euler is largely based on the above, but with OpenType math features added.
