= Signal (typeface) =

Signal is a script typeface, designed in 1931 by Walter Wege for H. Berthold AG in Berlin.

Designed for headlines and slogans, it was one of several typefaces inspired by brush script created in the late 1920s and early 1930s as hand-lettering went back in style. The standard version was followed up in 1932 by the bolder Block-Signal and the lighter Script-Signal. The latter was suitable for slightly longer pieces of copy. 1934 saw the release of Deutsch-Signal, based on German handwriting.

The typeface was used in creating the masthead of Signal, a Nazi magazine.
