= Titling capitals =

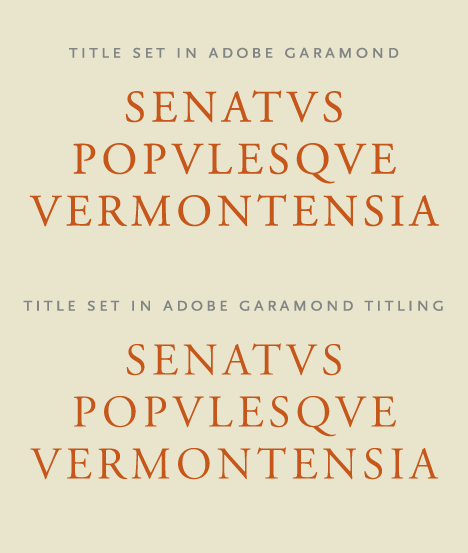
Comparison of uppercase text weight Adobe Garamond with uppercase Adobe Garamond Titling.

In typography, titling capitals are a variant of uppercase designed for headings and titles. The stroke width is reduced for use at larger point sizes where the stroke weight used in smaller text sizes would be too heavy.

Titling faces are often made to complement text faces intended for book typesetting. Titling faces have more open counter-forms.
