= Gravura =

- Category: Script
- Designer: Phill Grimshaw
- Date released: 1995

Gravura is a typeface based on copperplate style calligraphy.

Gravura is a script typeface of the copperplate model designed by British type designer Phill Grimshaw in 1995. This typeface is known for its cursive handwriting style.

== Notable uses ==
Gravura was used in the book Images of Missouri by Clair Wilcox.
