= ITC Kristen =

- Category: Script
- Designer: George Ryan
- Foundry: International Typeface Corporation

ITC Kristen is a casual script typeface consisting of two weights designed by George Ryan for the International Typeface Corporation (ITC). It was inspired by a handwritten menu at a Cambridge, Massachusetts restaurant, and has an asymmetric structure suggesting a child's handwriting.

A TrueType version of Kristen is shipped with Microsoft Publisher 2000.

== See also ==
- Comic Sans
- Choco Cooky
