= Wiesbaden Swing =

- Category: Script typeface
- Designer: Rosemarie Kloos-Rau
- Commissioned by: Linotype
- Date released: 1992
- Sample

Wiesbaden Swing is a script typeface, created by the German communication designer Rosemarie Kloos-Rau. Since the 1992 release by Linotype, several character sets have been published, including dingbats.

== History ==
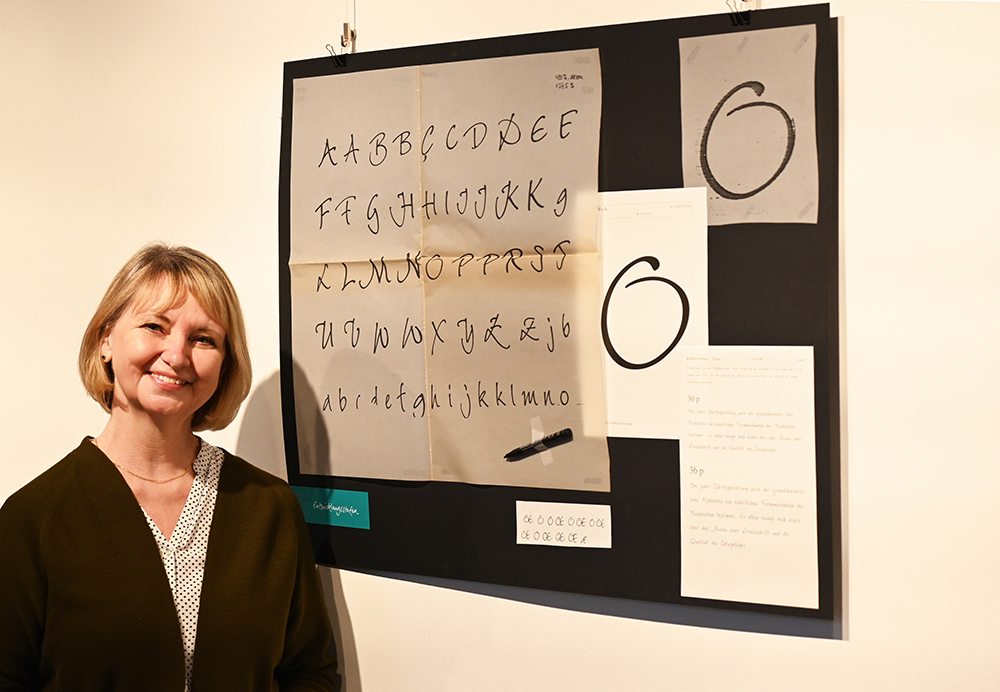
Rosemarie Kloos-Rau in front of the handwritten original of the font in the New Town Hall, Wiesbaden, 2022

Rosemarie Kloos-Rau is a calligrapher and typographer and was awarded in 1983 with the Rudo Spemann award. Until the 1990s, she worked as an illustrator and published together with Michael Rau the book Script Types in 1993. In 1992, she published the typeface Wiesbaden Swing for Linotype, named after Wiesbaden, the German regional capital of Hesse, where Kloos-Rau lives in the suburb of Biebrich. In 1997, Alexei Chekulayev created a version with cyrillic characters, and in 1999 a bold font style was published. Also, Dingbats are available.

In 2010, the graphical prototype of the typeface was incorporated into the Berlin Collection on Calligraphy in the archive of Academy of Arts, Berlin. To mark the 30th anniversary, in January 2022 the exhibition "Wiesbaden Swing: A Typeface Dances Around the World" was shown at the New Town Hall in Wiesbaden.

== Style ==
Following the German DIN standard 16518, Wiesbaden Swing is considered a script typeface or handwritten roman type. The typeface is rounded, but the characters are not connected. The author states that the typeface allows for a "fresh and unconventional" handling of the typography.

== Usage ==
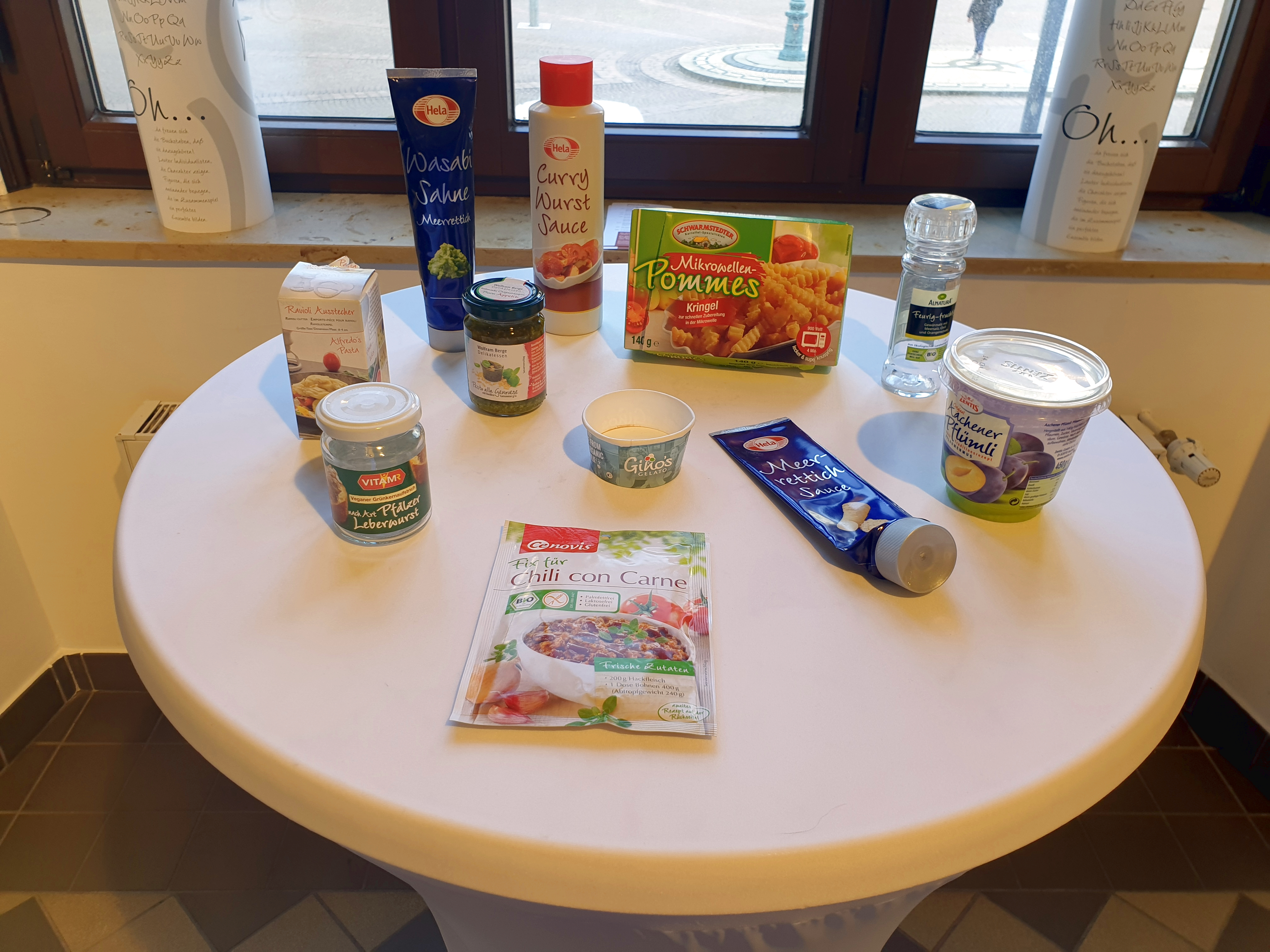
Products using Wiesbaden Swing

The typeface is used for headlines, slogans and mark designations, and as a celebration font, for example on greeting cards. It is frequently used in the food sector, examples are Maggi soup tureen, Lieken Weberli, Zentis jam, Alnatura tea und coffee, Duplo of Kinder Chocolate and Milka. The typeface is advertised as one of the "famous Linotype fonts from the last decade".
