= Martin Wait =

British designer (1942–2012)

Martin Wait (1942–2012) was a British font designer and graphic designer. He was best known for his work for Letraset, which created dry transfer lettering used on advertising and other lettering projects.

Wait was born in Forest Gate in London and attended Lister Community School in Plaistow. Despite having dyslexia, he created custom lettering for advertising, including logos for Tetley's, the Radio Times, Fox's Glacier Mints and Alpen cereal. He later came to design fonts for Letraset and Monotype, often in the script typeface genre.
