= Colin Brignall =

English type designer and photographer

Colin Brignall (born 1942) is an English type designer and photographer. In addition to designing typefaces himself, he has worked as a type director and typographic consultant to Letraset and the International Typeface Corporation (ITC), selecting and overseeing other designers' typefaces.

== Early life and career ==
Brignall was born in 1942 in Warwickshire. He began his career as a press photographer on Fleet Street in London, and in 1963 joined the type design studio Letraset as a photographic technician. While working at Letraset, he developed an interest in typography and began to design his own typefaces, despite having no formal training. He produced numerous typefaces for Letraset's dry transfer range beginning in the 1960s, including Aachen (1969), Premier Shaded (1970), Harlow (1977) and Superstar (1977). He later designed Italia (1977), Romic (1979), Corinthian (1981) and Edwardian (1983), which were designed for use in text rather than display, in contrast to his earlier work.

In 1980, Brignall became Type Director at Letraset, a role in which he was responsible for the selection and art direction of all new typefaces released by Letraset. He left Letraset in 1995 and was appointed Typographic Consultant to the International Typeface Corporation (ITC) in 1996, scouting new typefaces and designers. At ITC, he collaborated with other designers on several historical typeface revivals, including ITC Rennie Mackintosh, ITC Golden Cockerel and ITC Founder's Caslon. He later rejoined Letraset as Typographic Consultant.

The Type Directors Club awarded Brignall their TDC Medal in 2000, largely for his work in sourcing, directing and encourage the work of other type designers. It was the 20th medal awarded by the club in 32 years and the first presented outside the United States. Individually, Brignall has designed over 100 alphabets.
