= List of typefaces =

This is a list of typefaces, which are separated into groups by distinct artistic differences. The list includes typefaces that have articles or that are referenced. Superfamilies that fall under more than one category have an asterisk (*) after their name.

== Serif ==
- Adobe Jenson
- Albertus
- Aldus
- Algerian
- Amelia (Designed in 1963 by Stan Davis)
- American Typewriter
- Antiqua
- Arno*
- Aster
- Aurora and derivatives like News 706
- Baskerville
- Bell (Didone classification serif type designed by Richard Austin, 1788)
- Belwe Roman
- Bembo and derivatives like Aldine 401
- Bernhard Modern
- Bodoni (typeface family)
  - Bauer Bodoni
- Bitstream Charter
- Bookman
- Bulmer
- Caledonia
- Calisto MT
- Cambria
- Capitals
- Cartier
- Caslon
  - Wyld
- Caslon Antique / Fifteenth Century
- Centaur
- Century type family
- Charis SIL
- Cheltenham and derivatives like Gloucester
- Clearface
- Cloister Black
- Cochin and derivatives like Engravers' Oldstyle 205
- Computer Modern
- Concrete Roman
- Constantia
- Cooper Black
- Copperplate Gothic
- DejaVu Serif
- Didone (typeface classification)
- Didot
- Droid Serif
- Emerson
- Fairfield
- Fat face
- FF Scala
- Fixedsys
- Footlight
- Friz Quadrata
- Galliard (typeface)
- Garamond
- Gentium
- Georgia
- GNU FreeFont
- Goudy Old Style / Goudy
- Granjon
- Hermann Zapf
- Hightower Text
- Hoefler Text
- IBM Plex Serif*
- Imprint
- ITC Benguiat
- Janson
- Jokerman
- Joanna
- Korinna
- Legibility Group
- Lexicon
- Liberation Serif
- Linux Libertine
- Literaturnaya
- Lucida Bright*
- Ludwig & Mayer
- Matrix
- Memphis
- Miller
- Minion*
- "Modern": see Didone
- Mrs Eaves*
- MS Serif
- Melior and derivatives like Zapf Elliptical 711
- New York (one of the original Macintosh system fonts)
- Nimbus Roman No. 9 L
- NPS Rawlinson Roadway
- Noto Serif* (one of the Noto fonts)
- Palatino (and imitations such Book Antiqua, Sistina and Zapf Calligraphic 801)
- Perpetua and derivatives like Lapidary 333
- Plantin and derivatives like Aldine 721
- PT Fonts
- Requiem
- Rotis*
- Rudolph Ruzicka
- Sabon
- Source Serif
- Souvenir
- Stempel Schneidler
- Stephenson Blake
- STIX Fonts project (see also XITS font project)
- Sylfaen
- Theano Didot
- Times New Roman
- Trajan
- Trinité
- Trump Mediaeval
- University of California Old Style and derivatives like Berkeley Old Style and Californian FB
- Utopia
- Vera Serif
- Walbaum
- Windsor
- XITS font project

=== Slab serif ===
- Alexandria
- American Typewriter
- Archer
- Athens
- Bookman
- Candida
- Cholla Slab
- City
- Clarendon
- Concrete Roman
- Courier (the "typewriter face")
- Egyptienne
- Guardian Egyptian
- Legibility Group
- Lexia
- Memphis
- Nilland
- Roboto Slab
- Rockwell and clones like Geometric Slabserif 712
- Schadow
- Serifa
- Skeleton Antique
- Tower

=== Transitional serif ===
- Utopia
- Times New Roman (and Times)
- Perpetua and derivatives like Lapidary 333
- Plantin and derivatives like Aldine 721
- Mrs. Eaves
- Freight
- Modernised Old Style

== Sans-serif ==
- Agency FB
- Akzidenz-Grotesk and derivatives like Gothic 725
- Andalé Sans
- Antique Olive and derivatives like Incised 901
- Aptos
- Archivo
- Arial
- Arial Unicode MS
- Avant Garde Gothic
- Avenir
- Bank Gothic
- Bauhaus
- Bell Centennial
- Bell Gothic
- Benguiat Gothic
- Berlin Sans
- Brandon Grotesque
- Calibri
- Casey
- Century Gothic*
- Charcoal (Mac OS 9 system font)
- Chicago (pre-Mac OS 8 system font, still included with macOS)
- Clearview
- Comic Sans
- Compacta
- Corbel
- DejaVu Sans
- DIN 1451
- Dotum
- Droid Sans
- Dyslexie (designed to mitigate some of the issues that dyslexics experience when reading)
- Ecofont
- Eras
- Esseltub
- Espy Sans
- Eurocrat
- Eurostile and derivatives like Square 721
- FF Dax
- FF Meta*
- FF Scala Sans
- Fira Sans and variants
- Folio
- Franklin Gothic*
- FreeSans
- Frutiger and derivatives like Humanist 777
- Futura
- Geneva (one of the original Macintosh system fonts)
- Gill Sans*
  - Gill Sans Schoolbook
  - and clones like Humanist 521
- Gotham*
- Grand Slang
- Haettenschweiler
- Handel Gothic
- Hei
- Helvetica and derivatives like Helvetica Neue and Swiss 721
- Highway Gothic
- IBM Plex Sans*
- Impact
- Industria
- Inter
- Interstate
- Johnston/New Johnston
- Kabel and clones like Geometric 231
- Klavika
- Lato
- Liberation Sans
- Linux Biolinum
- Lucida* and variants
- Lydian
- Meiryo
- Meta
- Microgramma
- Motorway (used on British motorway signs for route numbers)
- MS Sans Serif (included with all Microsoft Windows versions, superseded by Arial)
- Myriad*
- Neutraface
- Neuzeit S
- News Gothic
- Nimbus Sans L
- Nordstern
- Open Sans
- Optima
  - Zapf Humanist 601
- Overpass
- Parisine (used by the RATP Group on their jurisdictions of Paris's transit system)
- Product Sans
- Proxima Nova
- PT Sans (made for all minority languages of Russian Federation)
- Rail Alphabet
- Roboto
- Rotis Sans
- San Francisco (default typeface in iOS 9 and above and OS X El Capitan and above)
- Segoe UI
- Skia (the first QuickDraw GX font, still found in macOS today)
- SNV
- Source Sans Pro
- SST*
- Sweden Sans
- Syntax
- System (Windows 3.x default)
- Tahoma
- Template Gothic
- Thesis Sans*
- Tiresias
- Toronto Subway (typeface)
- Trade Gothic
- Transport (used on British road signs)
- Trebuchet MS
- Twentieth Century (Tw Cen MT)
- Ubuntu
- Unica
- Univers
  - Zurich
- VAG Rounded
- Vera Sans
- Verdana

== Semi-serif ==
- Nyala
- Rotis Semi Serif
- EasyReading

== Monospace ==
- Andalé Mono
- Bitstream Vera (Vera Sans Mono)
- Consolas
- Courier
  - Courier New
- Century Schoolbook Monospace
- DejaVu Sans Mono
- Droid Sans Mono
- Everson Mono (also known as Everson Mono Unicode)
- Fira Mono and Fira Code
- Fixed
- Fixedsys
- IBM Plex Mono*
- Inconsolata
- Iosevka
- Letter Gothic
- Liberation Mono
- Lucida (font)#Lucida series: Console, Lucida Sans Typewriter
- Menlo
- Monaco (one of the original Macintosh system fonts)
- Monospace
- MS Gothic
- MS Mincho
- Nimbus Mono L
- OCR-A (Optical Character Recognition)
  - OCR-B
- PragmataPro
- Prestige Elite (also known as Prestige, a "typewriter" face that is similar to Courier)
- ProFont (a freeware font designed for easy readability at small sizes)
- Roboto Mono
- SimHei
- SST Typewriter
- SimSun
- Source Code Pro
- Terminal
- Ubuntu Mono
- Vera Sans Mono (Bitstream Vera)

== Script ==
=== Brush scripts ===
- Balloon
- Brush Script
- Choc and derivatives like Staccato 555
- Dom Casual
- Mistral and derivatives like Staccato 222
- Papyrus
- Segoe Script

=== Calligraphic ===
- American Scribe
- AMS Euler
- Apple Chancery
- Forte
- French Script
- ITC Zapf Chancery
- Kuenstler Script
- Monotype Corsiva
- Old English Text MT and clones like Cloister Black
- Zapfino

=== Handwriting ===
- Andy
- Ashley Script
- Cézanne
- Choco Cooky
- Comic Sans MS
- Comic Neue
- Dom Casual
- Freestyle Script
- Kristen
- Lucida Handwriting

=== Other script ===
- Coronet and derivatives like Ribbon 131
- Curlz
- Gravura
- Script (vector font included with Windows 2.1)
- Wiesbaden Swing

== Blackletter ==
- Bastard
- Breitkopf Fraktur
- Fette Fraktur (Fraktur Bold)
- Fletcher
- Fraktur
- Lucida Blackletter
- Old English Text and clones like Cloister Black
- Schwabacher
- Tannenberg
- Textualis (Textura)
- Theuerdank Fraktur
- Wallau

== Non-Latin ==
- Aharoni (including Hebrew script)
- Arial (Used in English, Arabic, Hebrew and other languages)
- Calibri (Greek)
- Chandas (Devanagari)
- Gadugi (Used by the American/Canadian Blackfoot tribe, and for the language called Carrier, and used by the Native American tribe of the Cherokee and for other languages)
- Grecs du roi (Greek)
- Japanese Gothic
- Jomolhari (Tibetan script)
- Kiran (Devanagari)
- Kochi
- Koren (Hebrew)
- Kruti Dev (Devanagari)
- Malgun Gothic (Korean sans-serif)
- Meiryo (Japanese sans-serif gothic typeface)
- Microsoft JhengHei (Traditional Chinese)
- Microsoft YaHei (Simplified Chinese)
- Minchō
- Ming
- Mona (Japanese)
- MS Gothic
- Nastaliq Navees
- Noto Sans
- Noto Serif
- Perpetua Greek
- Porson (Greek)
- Segoe UI Symbol (Latin, Braille, Coptic and Gothic)
- Shruti (Gujarati)
- SimSun
- Sylfaen (a multi-script serif font family, for various non-Latin scripts and is for the languages Armenian and Georgian)
- Tahoma has a very extensive character set including:

- Latin (extended including: "Latin 2" for eastern Europe, Turkish, and Vietnamese)
- Arabic (extended character set covering Urdu, Pashto, Kurdish, and others)
- and other alphabets: Cyrillic, Greek, Hebrew, and Thai.

- Tengwar
- Tibetan Machine Uni
- Wilson Greek

== Unicode fonts ==
A Unicode font is a computer font that maps glyphs to code points defined in the Unicode Standard. The term has become archaic because the vast majority of modern computer fonts use Unicode mappings, even those fonts which only include glyphs for a single writing system, or even only support the basic Latin alphabet. The distinction is historic: before Unicode, when most computer systems used only eight-bit bytes, no more than 256 characters (or control codes) could be encoded. This meant that each character repertoire had to have its own codepoint assignments – and thus a given codepoint could have multiple meanings. By assuring unique assignments, Unicode resolved this issue.

Fonts which support a wide range of Unicode scripts and Unicode symbols are sometimes referred to as "pan-Unicode fonts", although as the maximum number of glyphs that can be defined in a TrueType font is restricted to 65,535, it is not possible for a single TrueType font to provide individual glyphs for all defined Unicode characters (172,808 characters, with Unicode 18.0). This article lists some widely used Unicode fonts (those shipped with an operating system or produced by a well-known commercial font company) that support a comparatively large number and broad range of Unicode characters.

This list of more comprehensive Unicode fonts, including open-source Unicode typefaces, showing the number of characters/glyphs included for the released version, and also showing font's license type:

- Alphabetum (shareware, includes a few SMP character blocks. Over 5,490 characters in version 9.00)
- Arial Unicode MS (distributed along with Microsoft Office (2002XP, 2003). only supports up to Unicode 2.0. Contains 50,377 glyphs (38,917 characters) in v1.01.)
- Bitstream Cyberbit (free for non-commercial use. 29,934 glyphs in v2.0-beta.)
- Bitstream Vera (free/open source, limited coverage with 300 glyphs, DejaVu fonts extend Bitstream Vera with thousands of glyphs)
- Charis SIL (free/open source, over 4,600 glyphs in v4.114)
- Code2000 (shareware Unicode font; supports the entire BMP. 63,888 glyphs in v1.15. Abandoned.)
  - Code2001 (freeware; supports the SMP. 2,944 glyphs in v0.917. Abandoned.)
  - Code2002
- DejaVu fonts (free/open source, "DejaVu Sans" includes 3,471 glyphs and 2,558 kerning pairs in v2.6)
- Doulos SIL (free/open source, designed for IPA, 3,083 glyphs in v4.014.)
- EB Garamond (free/open source, includes 3,218 glyphs in 2017)
- Everson Mono (also known as Everson Mono Unicode. Shareware; contains all non-CJK characters. 4,899 glyphs in Macromedia Fontographer v4.1.3 2003-02-13.)
- Fallback font (freeware fallback font for Windows)
- Free UCS Outline Fonts aka FreeFont (free/open source, "FreeSerif" includes 3,914 glyphs in v1.52, MES-1 compliant)
- Gentium (free/open source; includes over 4,500 glyphs in 2025)
- GNU Unifont (free/open source, bitmapped glyphs are inclusive as defined in unicode-5.1 only)
- Georgia Ref (also distributed under the name "MS Reference Serif," extension of the Georgia typeface)
- Gulim/New Gulim and Dotum, rounded sans-serif and non-rounded sans-serif respectively, (distributed with Microsoft Office 2000. wide range of CJK (Korean) characters. 49,284 glyphs in v3.10.)
- Junicode (free; includes many obsolete scripts, intended for mediævalists. 2,235 glyphs in v0.6.12.)
- Last Resort (fallback font covering all 17 Unicode planes, included with Mac OS 8.5 and up)
- Lucida Grande (Unicode font included with macOS; includes 1,266 glyphs)*
- Lucida Sans Unicode (included in more recent Microsoft Windows versions; only supports ISO 8859-x characters. 1,776 glyphs in v2.00.)*
- MS Gothic (distributed with Microsoft Office, 14,965 glyphs in v2.30)
- MS Mincho (distributed with Microsoft Office, 14,965 glyphs in v2.31)
- Nimbus Sans Global
- Noto, a family of fonts designed by Google: nearly 64,000 glyphs as of 2018.
- PragmataPro, a modular monospaced font family designed by Fabrizio Schiavi, Regular version includes more than 7000 glyphs
- Squarish Sans CT v0.10 (1,756 glyphs; Latin, Greek, Cyrillic, Hebrew, and more)
- STIX (especially mathematics, symbols and Greek, see also XITS)
- Titus Cyberbit Basic (free; updated version of Cyberbit. 9,779 glyphs in v3.0, 2000.)
- Verdana Ref (also distributed under the name "MS Reference Sans Serif," extension of the Verdana typeface)
- XITS (especially mathematics, symbols and Greek)

== Dingbat/Symbol fonts ==
- Apple Symbols (Included with macOS)
- Asana-Math
- Blackboard bold
- Bookshelf Symbol 7
- Cambria Math
- Computer Modern
- Lucida Math*
- Marlett
- Symbol (consists of Greek letters and mathematical symbols)
- Webdings
- Wingdings
  - Wingdings 2
  - Wingdings 3
- Zapf Dingbats

== Display/Decorative fonts ==
- Ad Lib
- Allegro
- Andreas
- Arnold Böcklin
- Astur
- Banco
- Bauhaus
- Braggadocio
- Broadway
- Caslon Antique
- Cooper Black
- Curlz
- Ellington
- Exocet
- FIG Script
- Forte
- Gabriola
- Horizon
- Jim Crow
- Lo-Type
- Neuland
- Peignot
- San Francisco
- Stencil
- Toronto Subway (typeface)
- Umbra
- Westminster
- Willow
- Windsor

== Ethnic fonts ==
- Lithos (Greek)
- Höfðaletur (Icelandic)

== Miscellaneous ==
- Compatil
- Generis
- Grasset
- Luxi
- Sans forgetica (learning aid font)

== See also ==
- Adobe Originals
- Computer font
- Font family (HTML)
- Font management software
- Gaelic type
- List of Apple typefaces
- List of typefaces included with Microsoft Windows
- List of public signage typefaces
- List of typefaces designed by Frederic Goudy
- List of typefaces included with macOS
- Record type
- Vox-ATypI classification
