= Tiresias (typeface) =

Typeface designed for people with impaired vision

- Category: Sans-serif
- Designer: The Royal National Institute for the Blind (RNIB)
- License: GNU General Public License

Tiresias is a family of TrueType sans-serif typefaces that were designed with the aim of legibility by people with impaired vision at the Scientific Research Unit of Royal National Institute of Blind People in London. The font was originally designed for the RNIB by Chris Sharville of Laker Sharville Design Associates who was working with John Gill at the time.

The family includes

- Tiresias Infofont – for information labels, optimized for maximum legibility at a distance of 30–100 cm.
- Tiresias Keyfont – for labeling the tops of keys of keyboards, PIN pads, appliances, remote controls (features exaggerated punctuation marks, no descender on the J)
- Tiresias LPfont – for large-print publications. A wedge-serif design.
- Tiresias PCfont – for raster displays
- Tiresias Screenfont – for television subtitling and on-screen user interfaces
- Tiresias Signfont – a more open spacing for use on signs

In late 2007, all Tiresias fonts except Tiresias Screenfont were released under the GNU General Public License version 3 or any later version.

The name likely refers to Tiresias from Greek Mythology, a blind prophet of Apollo.

== Tiresias Screenfont ==
Tiresias Screenfont was developed as new font for digital television subtitles. It was mandated for use on UK (DVB-T) by the Independent Television Commission and is still one of the fonts recommended for use by Ofcom. However, the font has come in for criticism for the development and testing process, the lack of italics and design.

The Tiresias Screenfont was sold by Bitstream Inc., who in 2012 were acquired by Monotype Corporation. The acquiring company continues to market Tiresias on its websites.

== See also ==
- List of typefaces
