= Mary Griggs Burke =

American art collector (1916–2012)

Mary (Livingston) Griggs Burke
- Born: June 20, 1916; St. Paul, Minnesota
- Died: December 8, 2012 (aged 96); Manhattan, New York City
- Resting place: Oakland Cemetery, Saint Paul, Ramsey County, Minnesota, USA
- Education: Sarah Lawrence College (BA); Columbia University (MA)
- Occupation(s): President of the Mary and Jackson Burke Foundation
- Organization(s): Mary and Jackson Burke Foundation
- Title: The Mother of Japanese Art in America
- Spouse: Jackson Burke
- Parents: Theodore W. Griggs (father); Mary Steele Livingston (mother)
- Awards: Order of the Sacred Treasure, Gold and Silver Star
- Website: http://burkecollection.org/

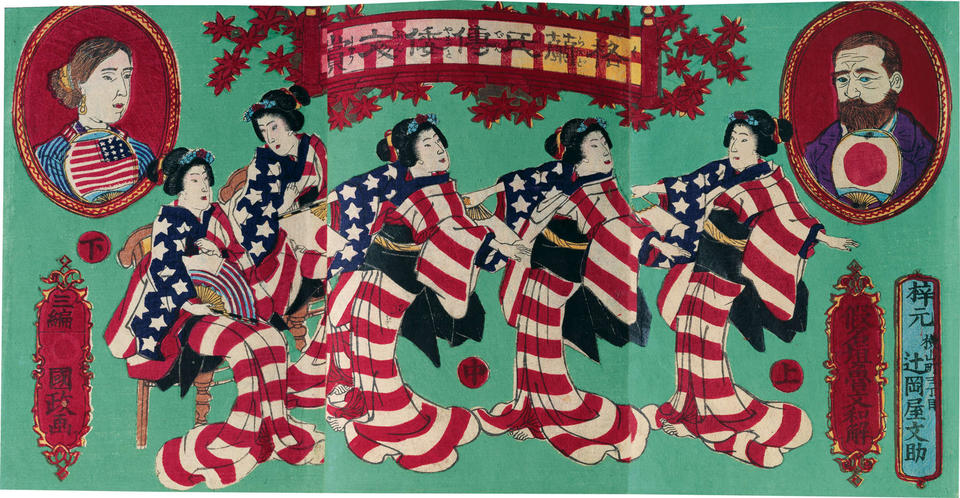
The Life of President Grant in Japanese (Gurando-shi den wabunshō),1879, Utagawa (Baidō) Kokunimasa

Mary Griggs Burke (June 20, 1916 – December 8, 2012) was an American art collector. Over fifty years, Burke acquired the largest private collection of Japanese art outside Japan. Her collection grew so large that she housed it in a separate apartment adjacent to her own on the Upper East Side of Manhattan. In 1985, portions of her collection were exhibited at the Tokyo National Museum, becoming the first Western collection of Japanese art to be displayed at the museum. Mary Griggs Burke was a Trustee, (1976-1995) and Trustee Emeritus (1995-2012) to The Metropolitan Museum of Art. She also inherited Forest Lodge, a family lake-side property on Lake Namakagon near Cable, Wisconsin which she loved dearly; that property was left to Northland College in Ashland, Wisconsin, along with a $10-million endowment to create the Mary Griggs Burke Center for Freshwater Innovation.

== Biography ==
Burke was born Mary Livingston Griggs in St. Paul, Minnesota, on June 20, 1916, to Theodore W. Griggs and Mary Steele Livingston. Her mother was the grandniece of Gen. Henry Hastings Sibley, the first Governor of Minnesota. Her maternal grandfather, Crawford Livingston, and paternal grandfather, Col. Chauncey Griggs, were early leaders in the city of St. Paul who both profited handsomely from banking and railroads.

Burke received her bachelor's degree from Sarah Lawrence College in 1938 and earned a master's degree in clinical psychology from Columbia University. She married the typeface designer Jackson Burke in 1955.

Burke and her spouse began to collect Japanese art in the 1960s. This endeavor flourished and in 1972 the Mary and Jackson Burke Foundation was created. On May 10, 1973, her foundation purchased their first art piece: a pair of six-panel folding screens by Kano Sanraku (1559-1635) titled View of the West Lake. Burke served as the foundation's President from the beginning to December 4, 2008, then was elected Honorary President until the end of her life. The collection of artwork is known as the most important collections of Japanese art held by a private group outside of Japan.

The government of Japan awarded her the Order of the Sacred Treasure in 1987.

During a brief stay in Japan, art dealers in both Kyoto and Tokyo gave Burke the nickname "姫 (hime)" which translates to "princess" due to her modesty, enthusiasm, and intellectual curiosity, which at the time were attributes associated with the aristocracy. One other title that Burke was given was the title "The Mother of Japanese Art in America". Mary Griggs Burke first opened up the Burke Collection to the public at The Metropolitan Museum of Art, New York in 1975. In 1985 the Tokyo National Museum also presented an exhibition of the collection, which at the time was the only exhibit of a private collection of Japanese art from abroad. Burke had also made her collection open to students as she was a devoted patron of Miyeko Murase’s graduate teaching program at Columbia University, New York. Through this, many students received financial support for their study and the opportunity to travel to Japan for further research.

Mary Griggs Burke died at her home in Manhattan, New York City, on December 8, 2012, at the age of 96. She was a widow, as her husband Jackson Burke, whom she married in 1955, died in 1975. Her vast collection of Japanese art was divided between the Metropolitan Museum of Art in New York City and the Minneapolis Institute of Arts following her death, as she had announced previously in 2006. On March 16, 2015 the two museums jointly announced the details of their respective bequests.

In addition to her home in New York City, she kept a winter home in Hobe Sound, Florida and her family summer home, Forest Lodge on Lake Namakagon just outside Cable, Wisconsin.

== Collection ==
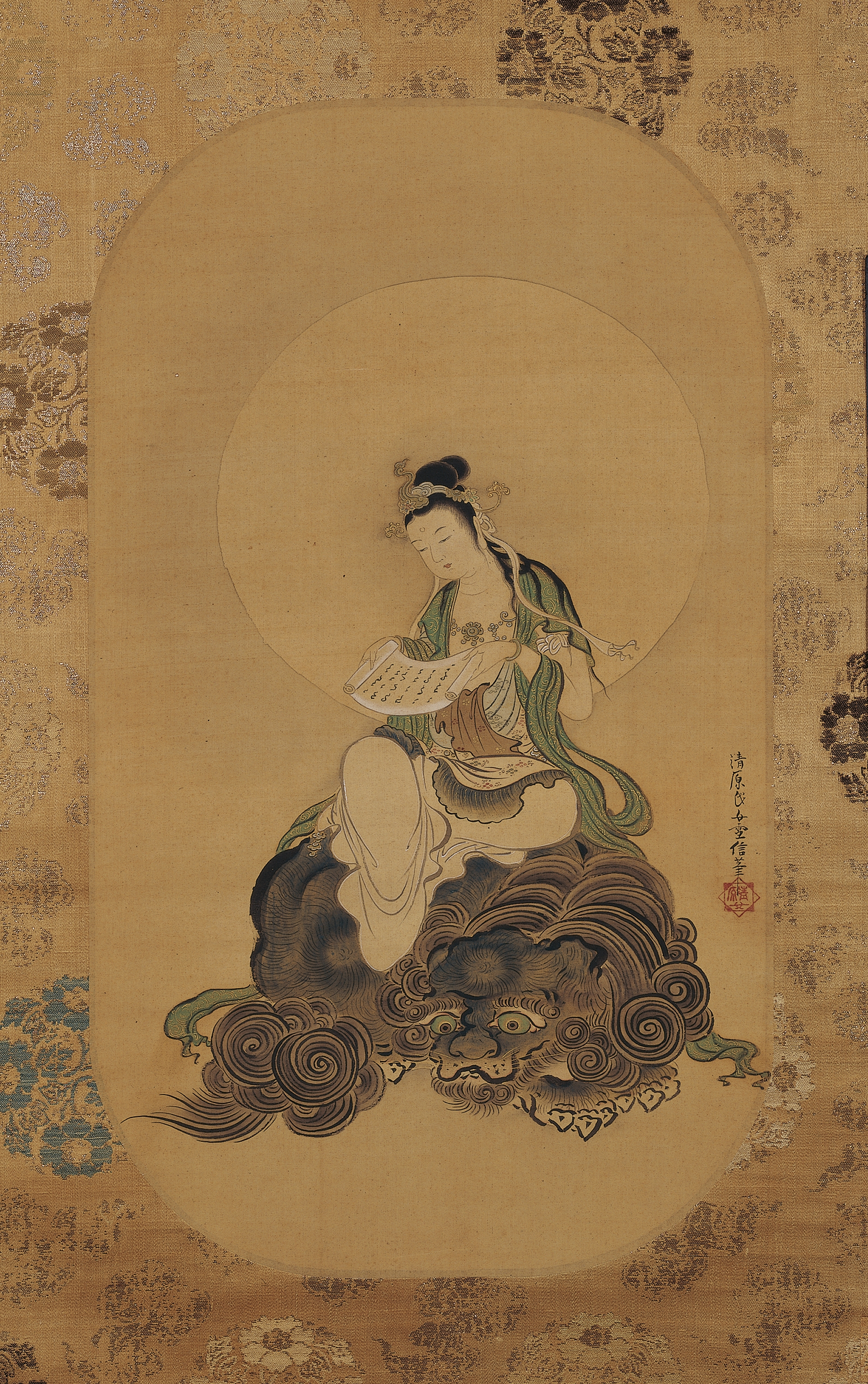
Monju on a Lion, hanging scroll by Kiyohara Yukinobu (1643-1682)

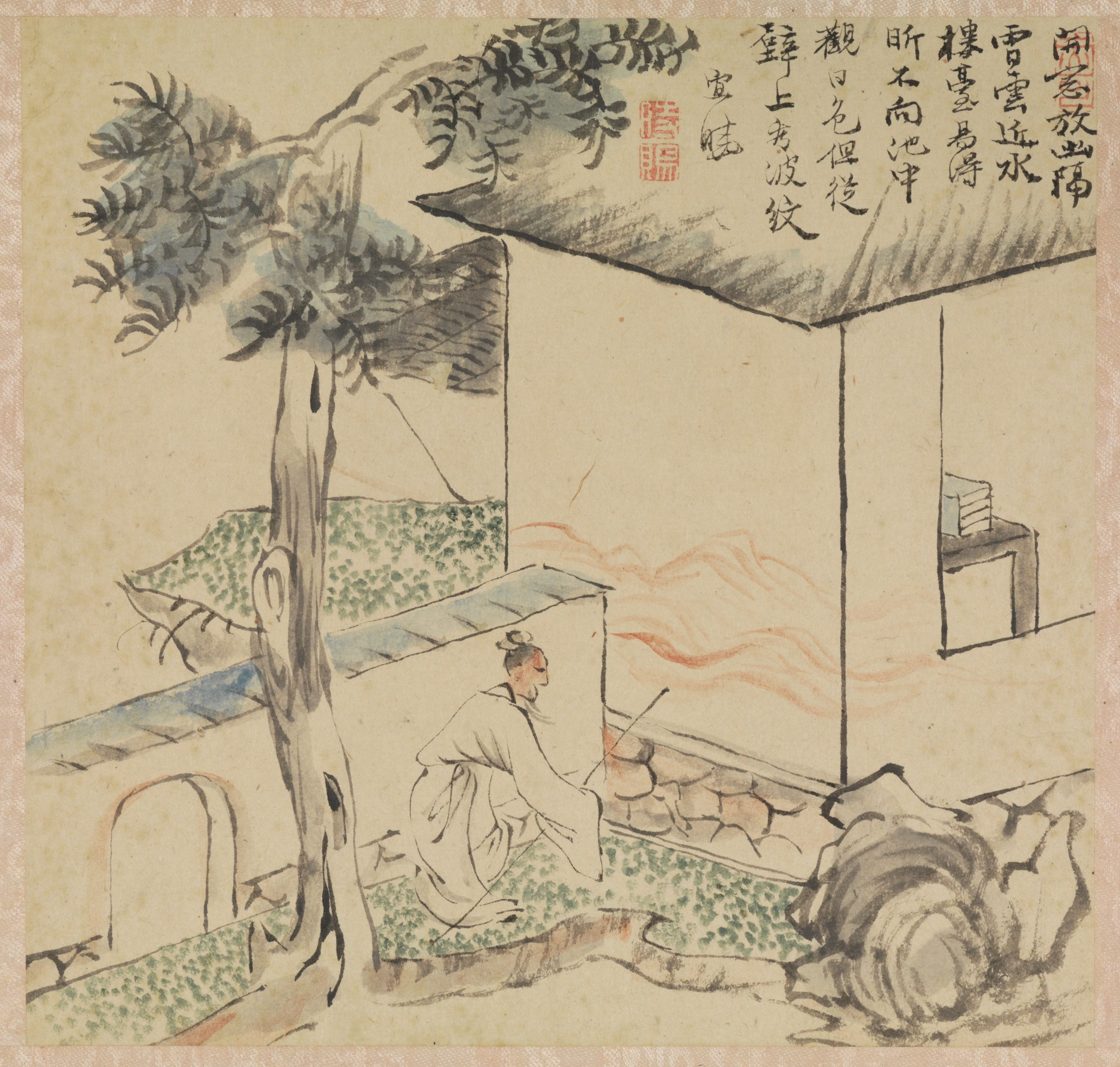
Japanese Painting by Totoki Baigai, 19th century

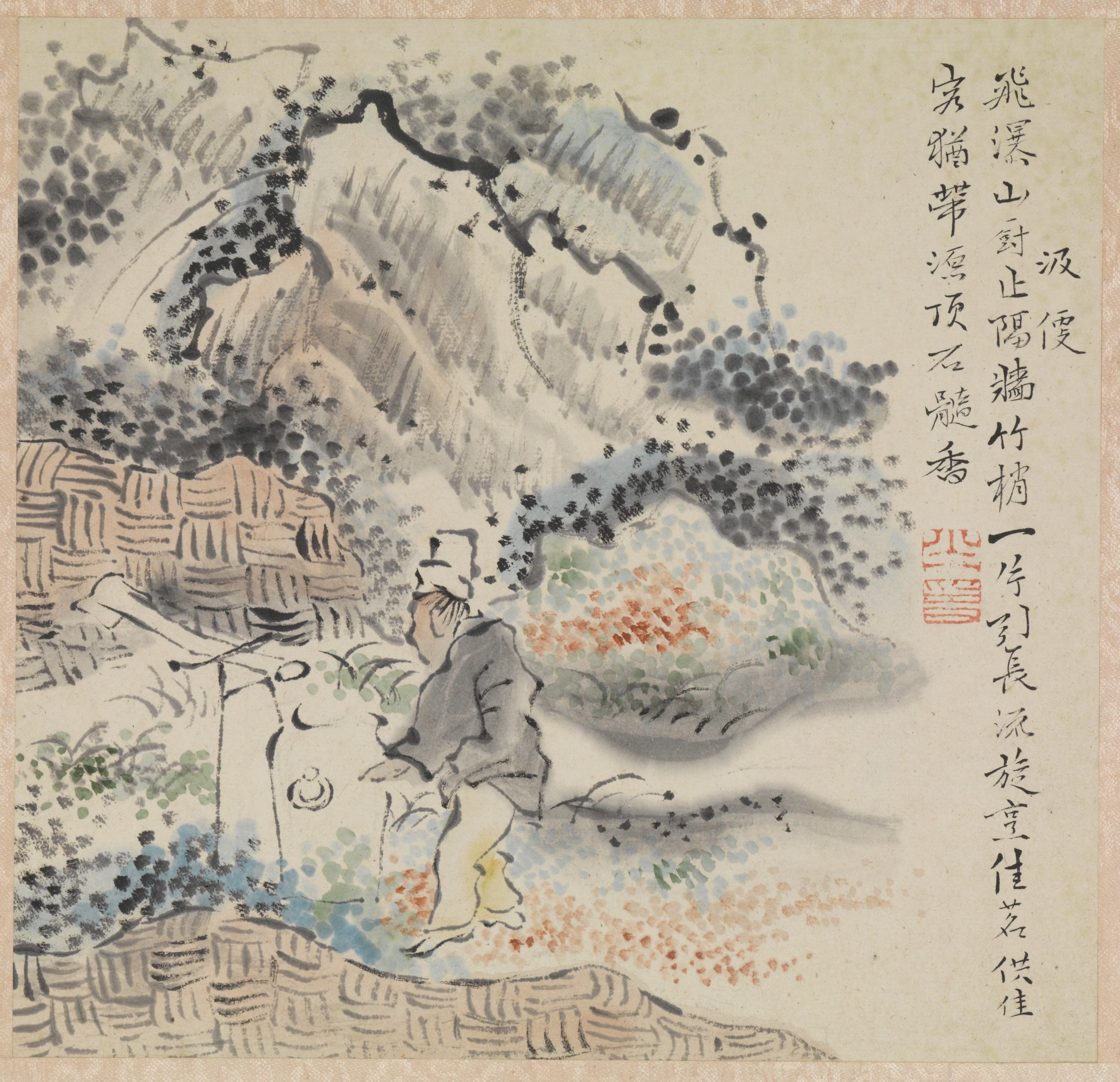
Japanese Painting by Totoki Baigai, 19th century

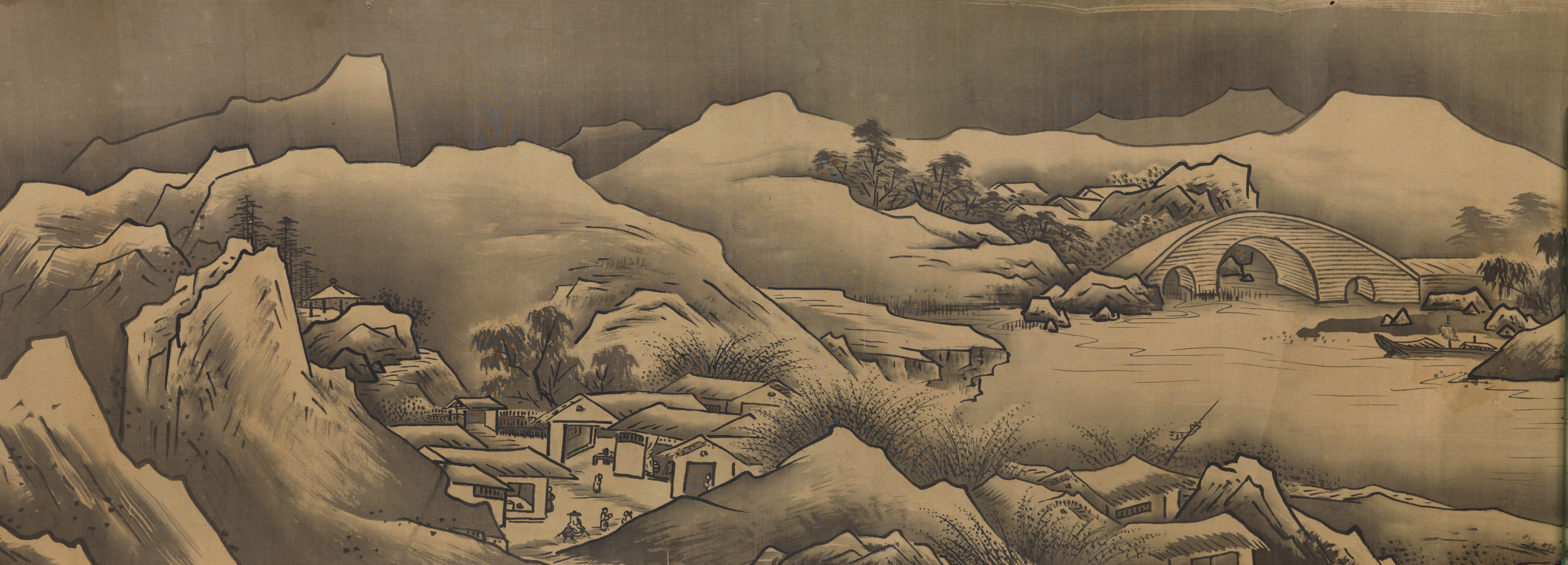
Handscroll by Unkoku Toban, 17th century

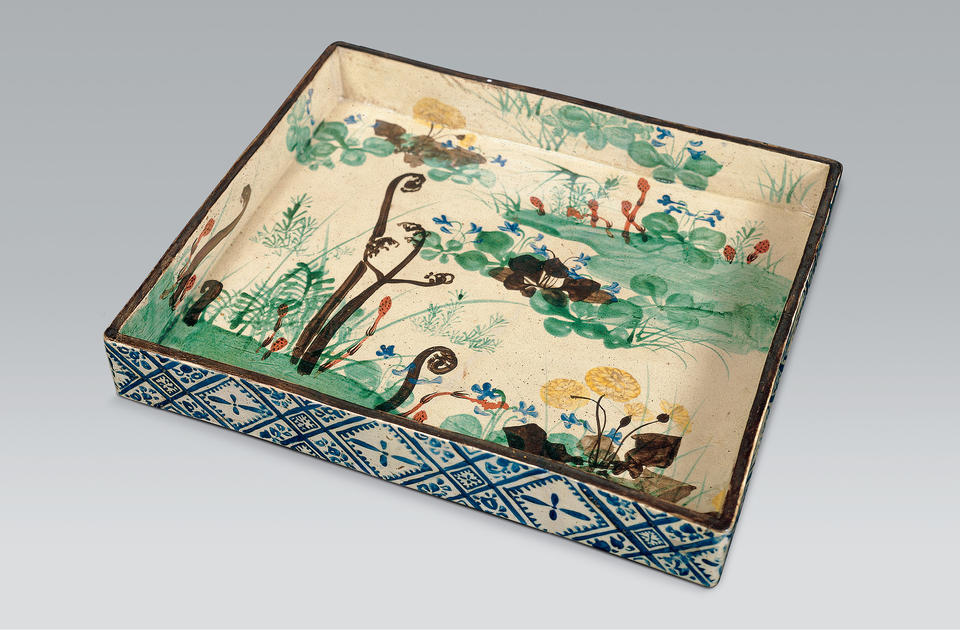
Square Dish with Spring Flowers by Ogata Kenzan (1663-1743)

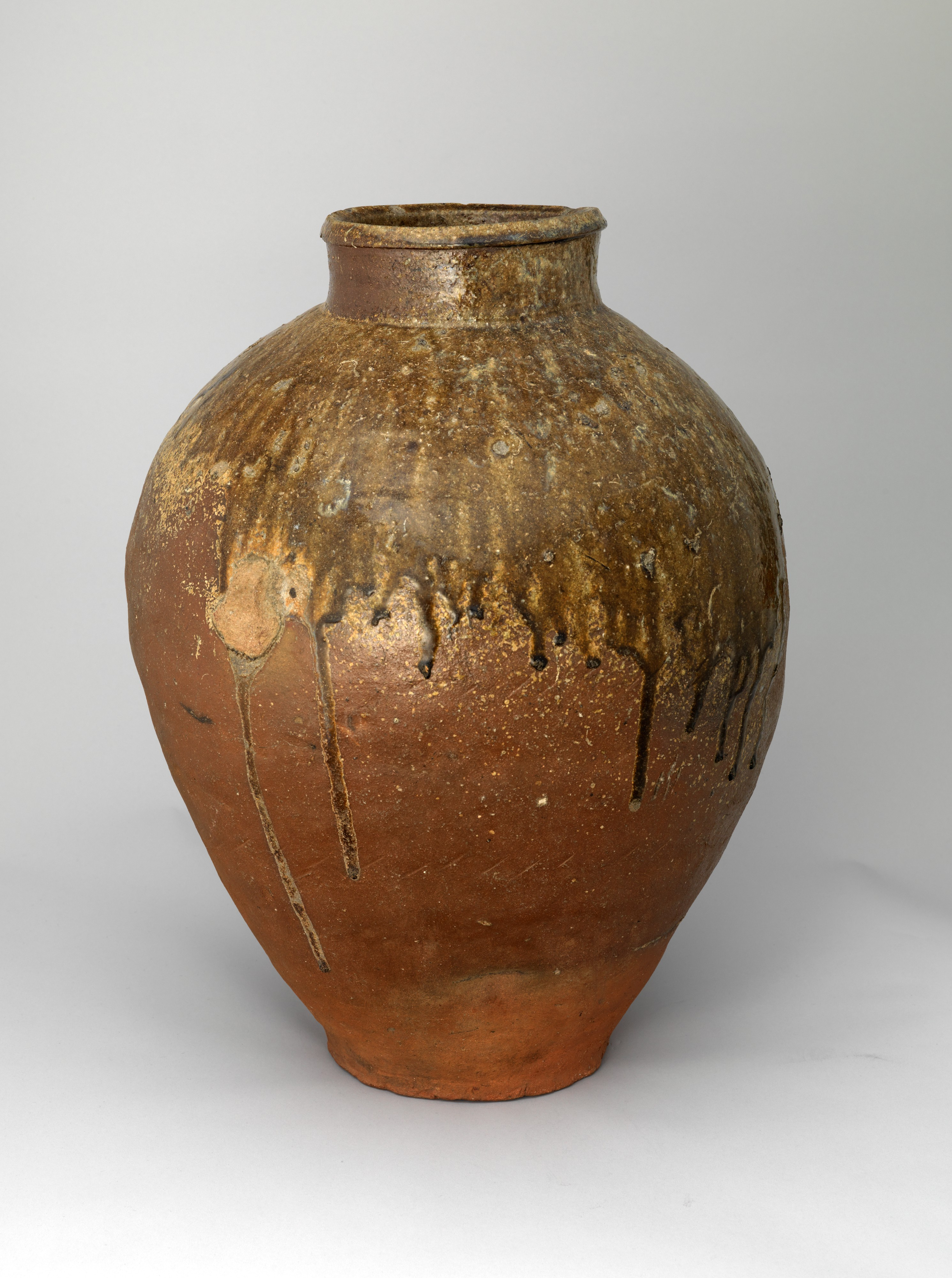
Large Storage Jar (Ōtsubo), Tokoname ware, 16th century

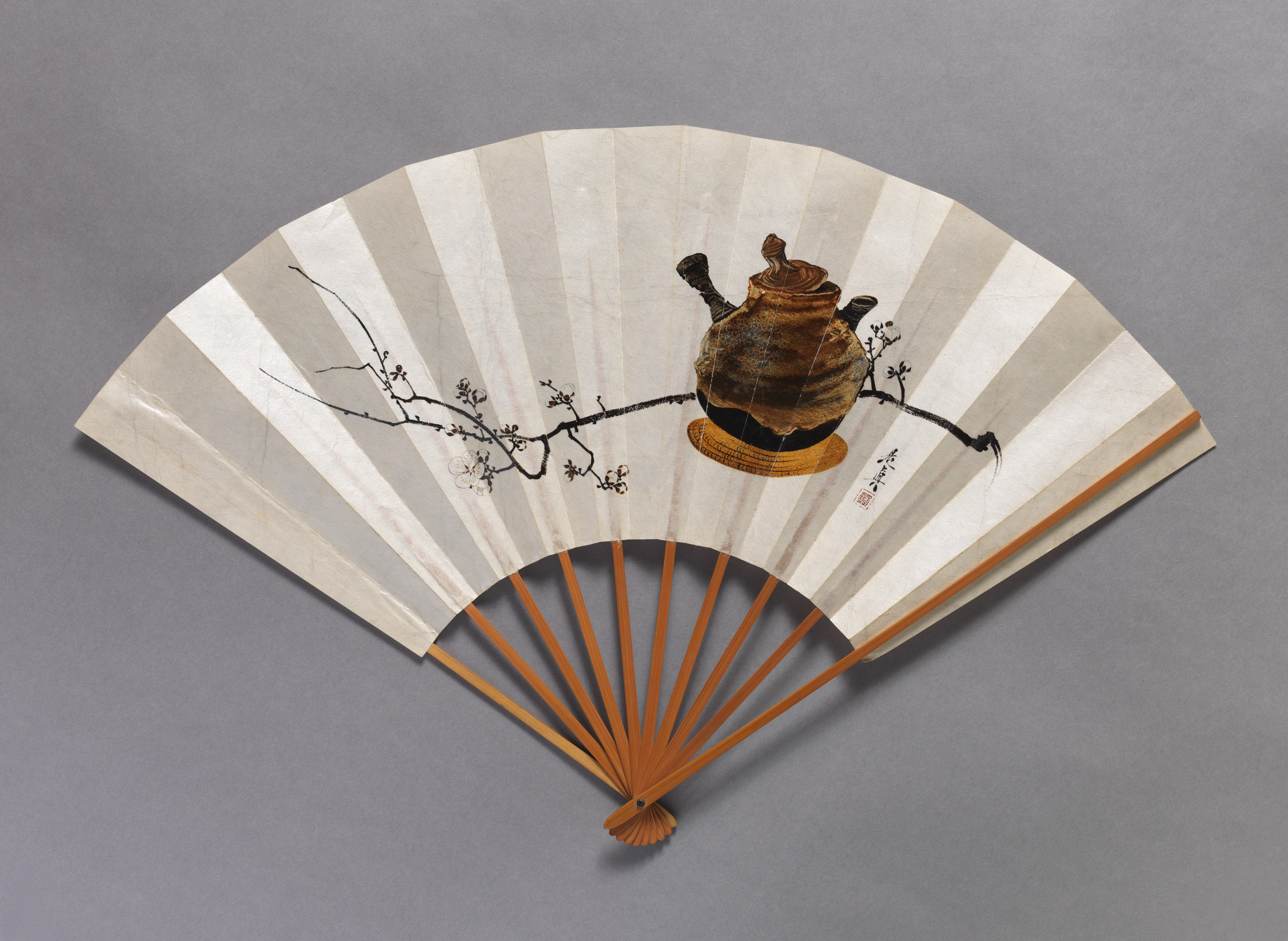
Japanese Folding Fan by Shibata Zeshin (1807-1891)

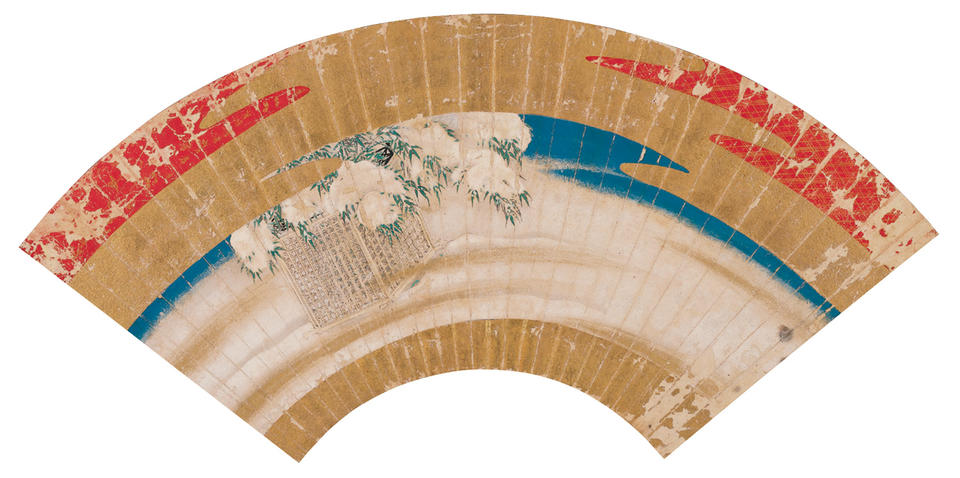
Two Folding Fans on Panels by Okada Tamechika, 19th century

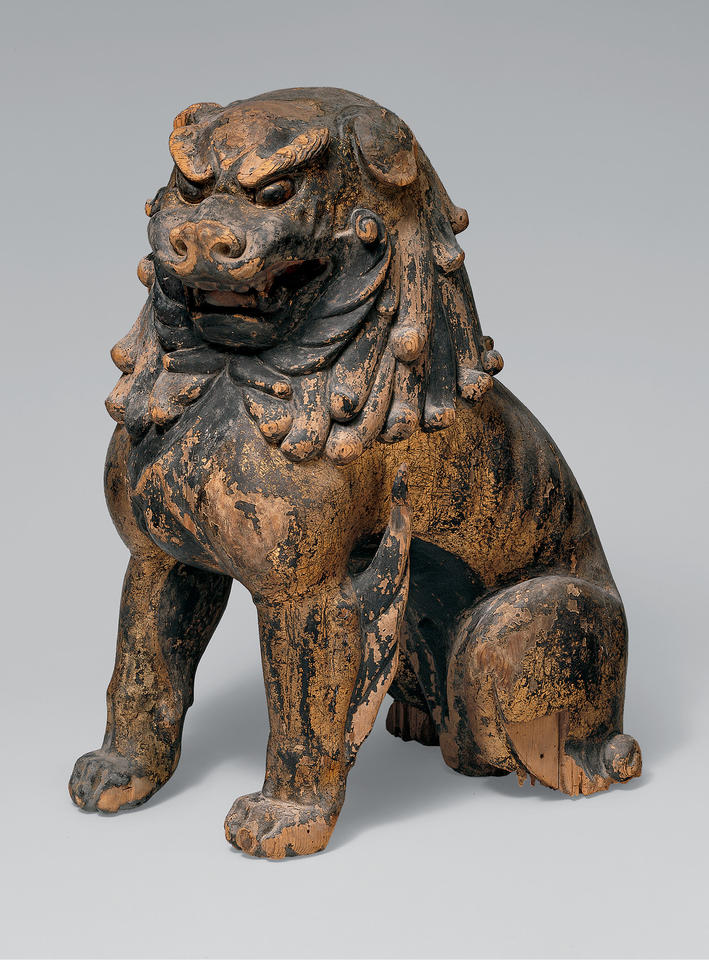
狛犬像, Guardian Lion Dog, Mid-13th century

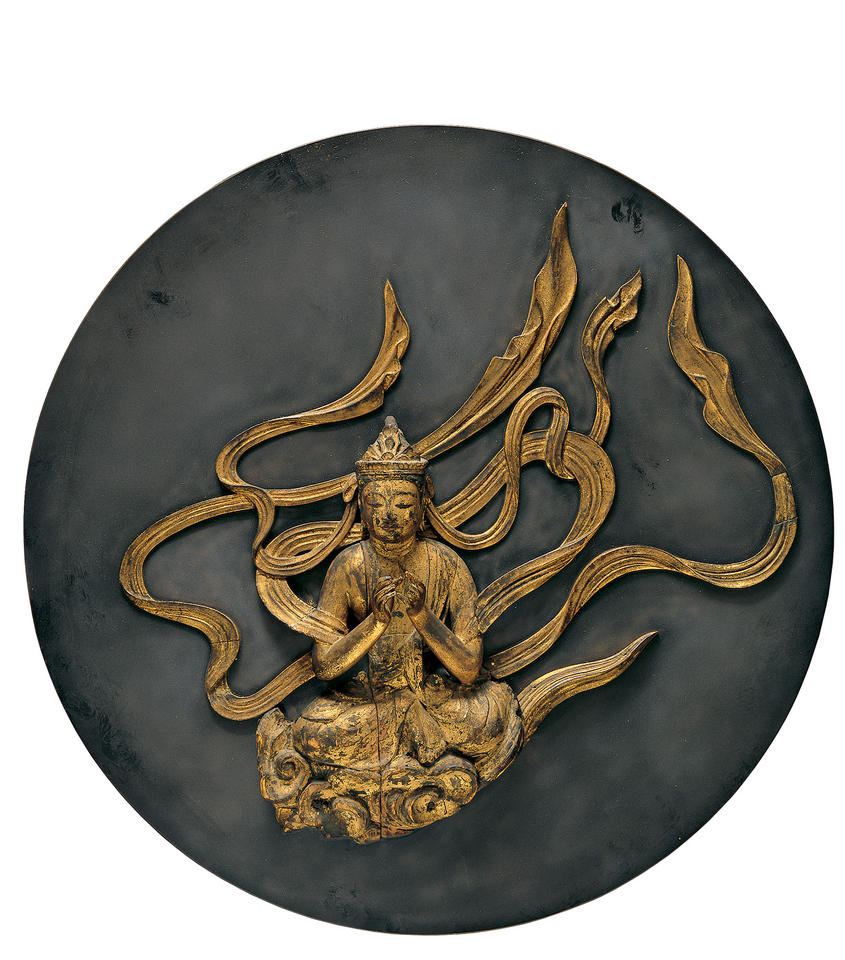
飛天像, Flying apsaras (Hiten), late 11th century to early 12th century

Deer Mandala of Kasuga Shrine

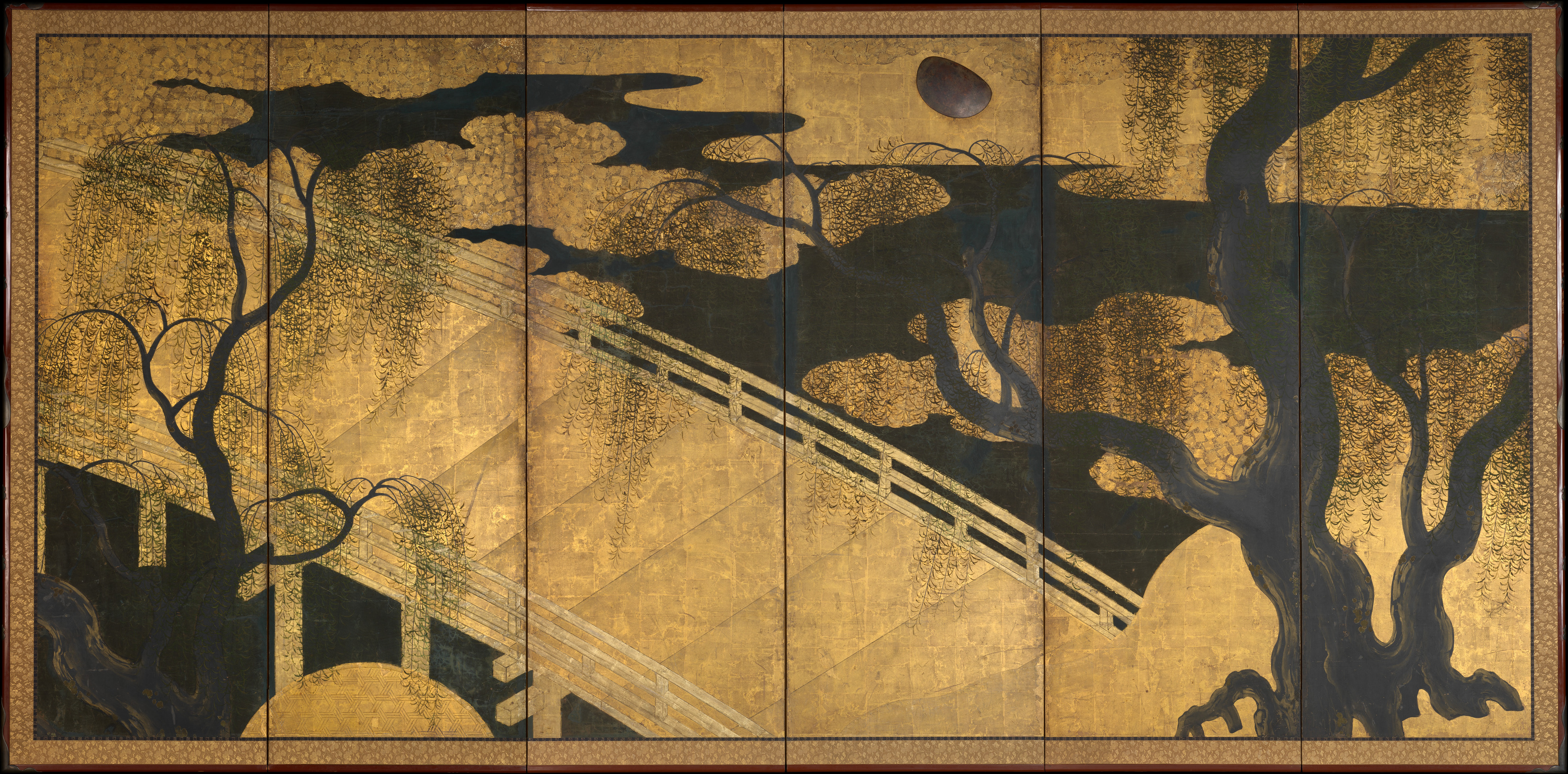
Willows and Bridge

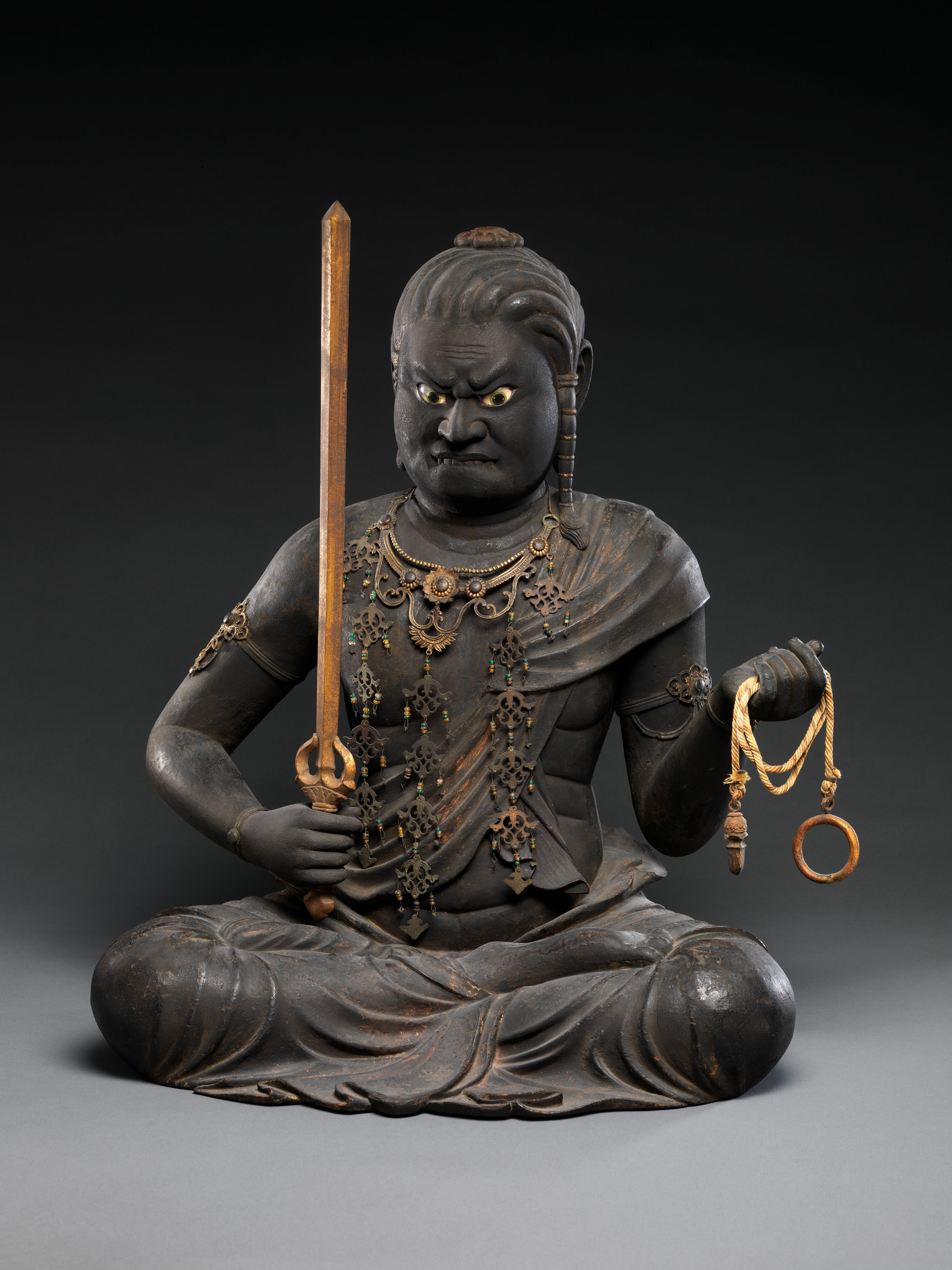
Fudō Myōō

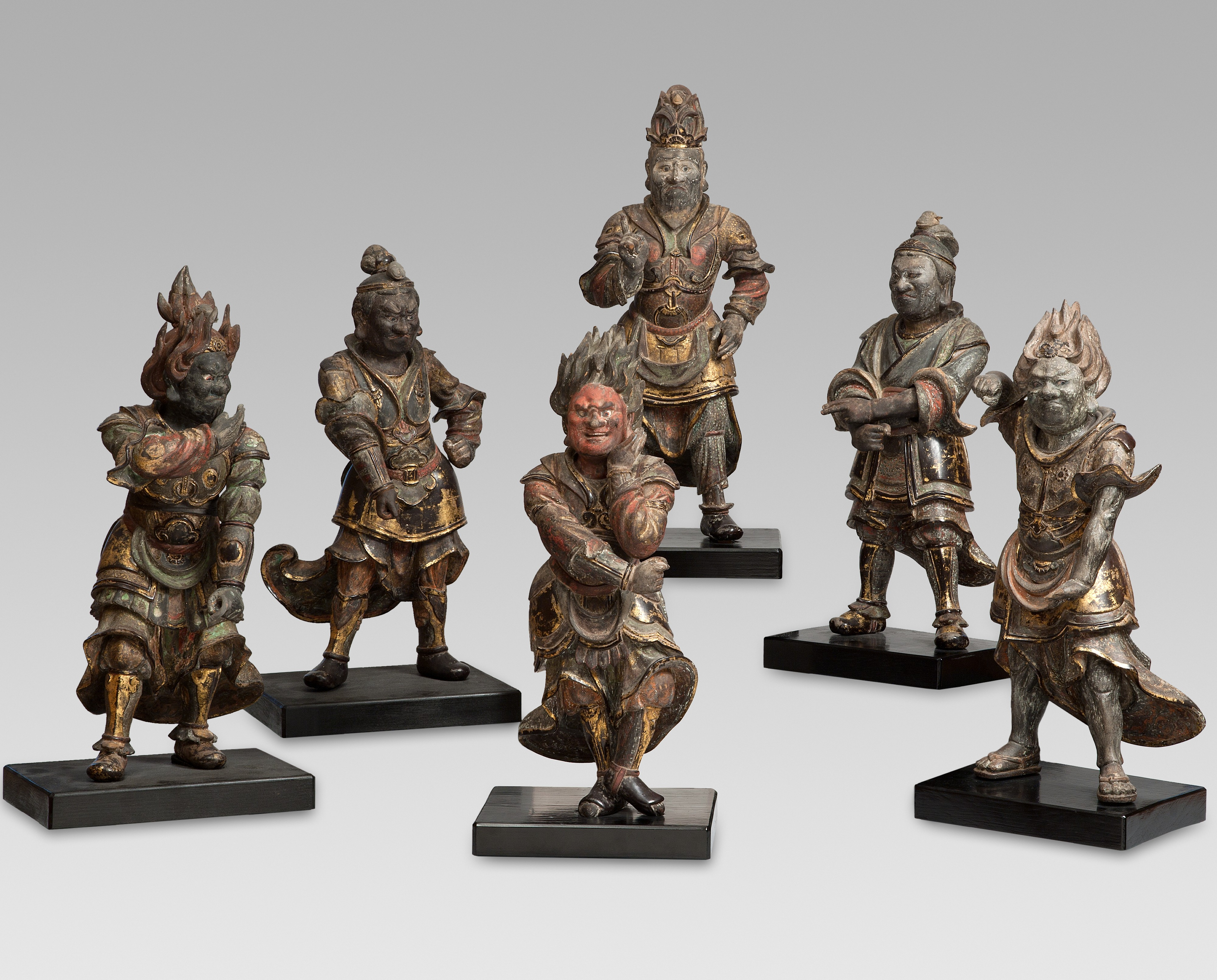
Six of the Twelve Divine Generals (Jūni shinshō)

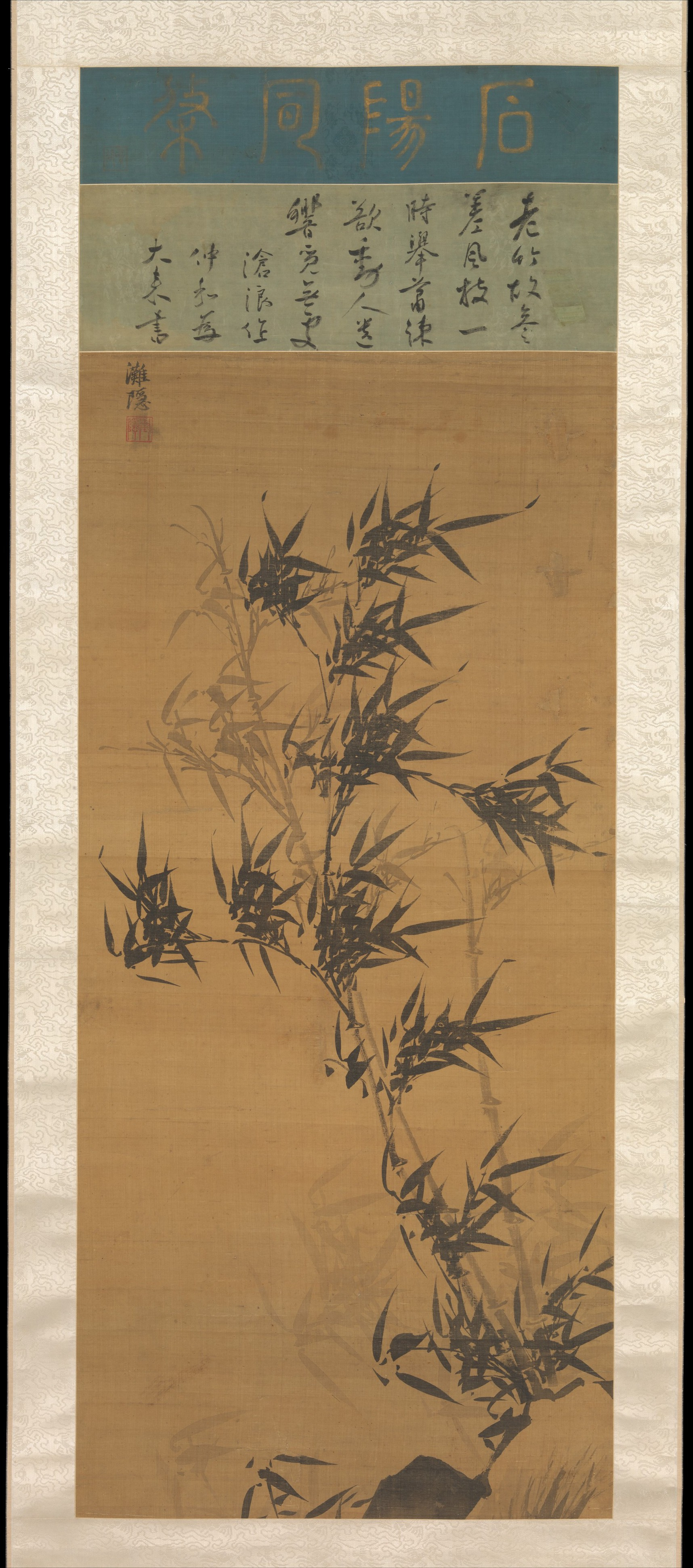
Bamboo in the wind

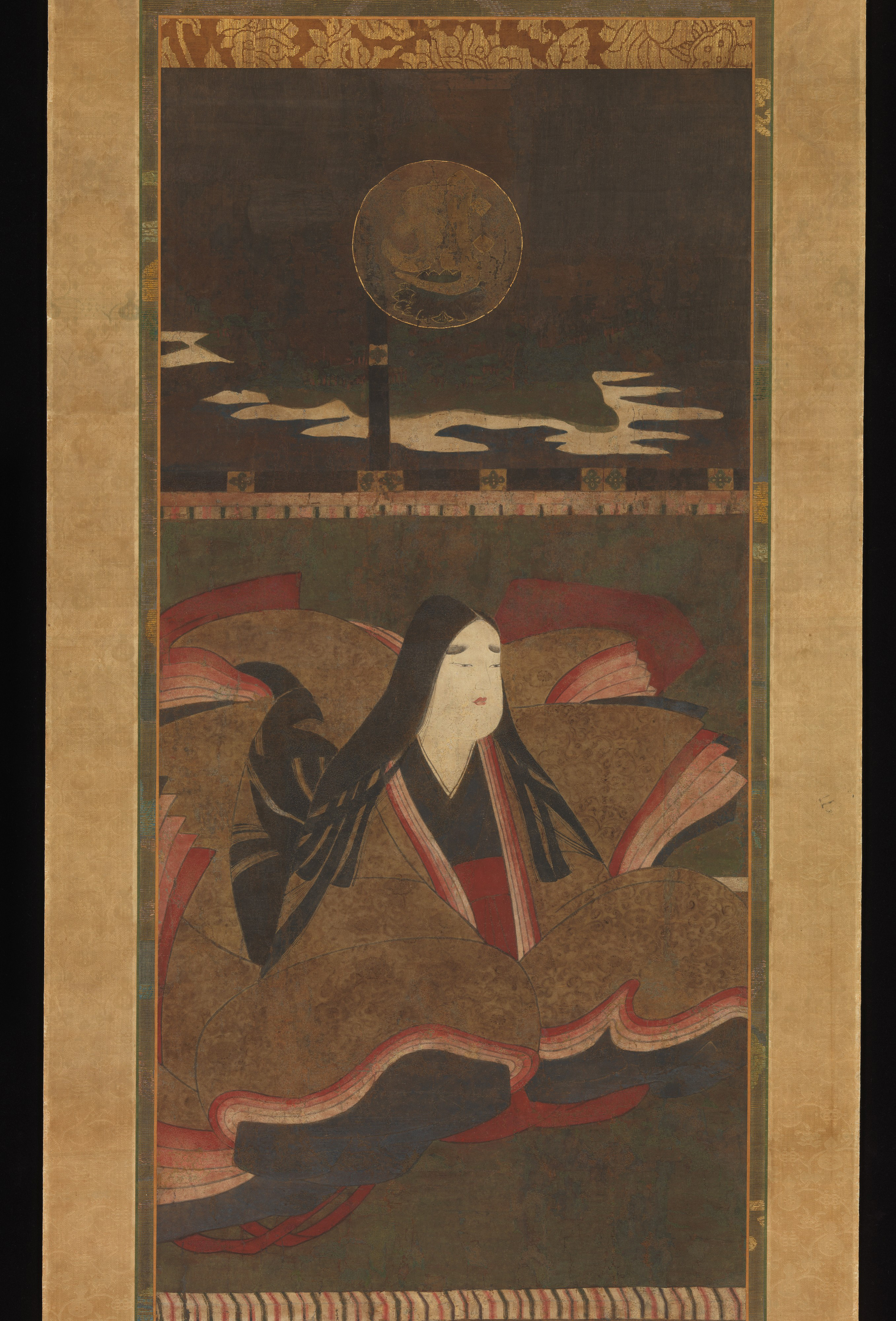
Niu Myōjin

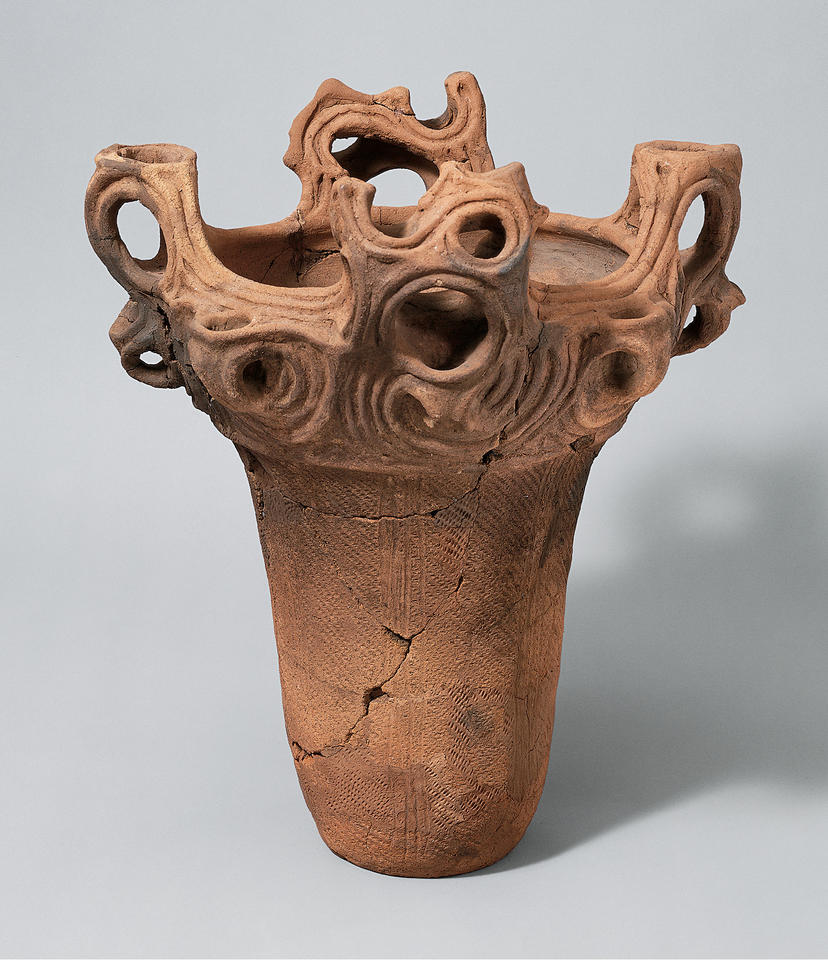
Flame-Rimmed” Cooking Vessel (Kaen doki)

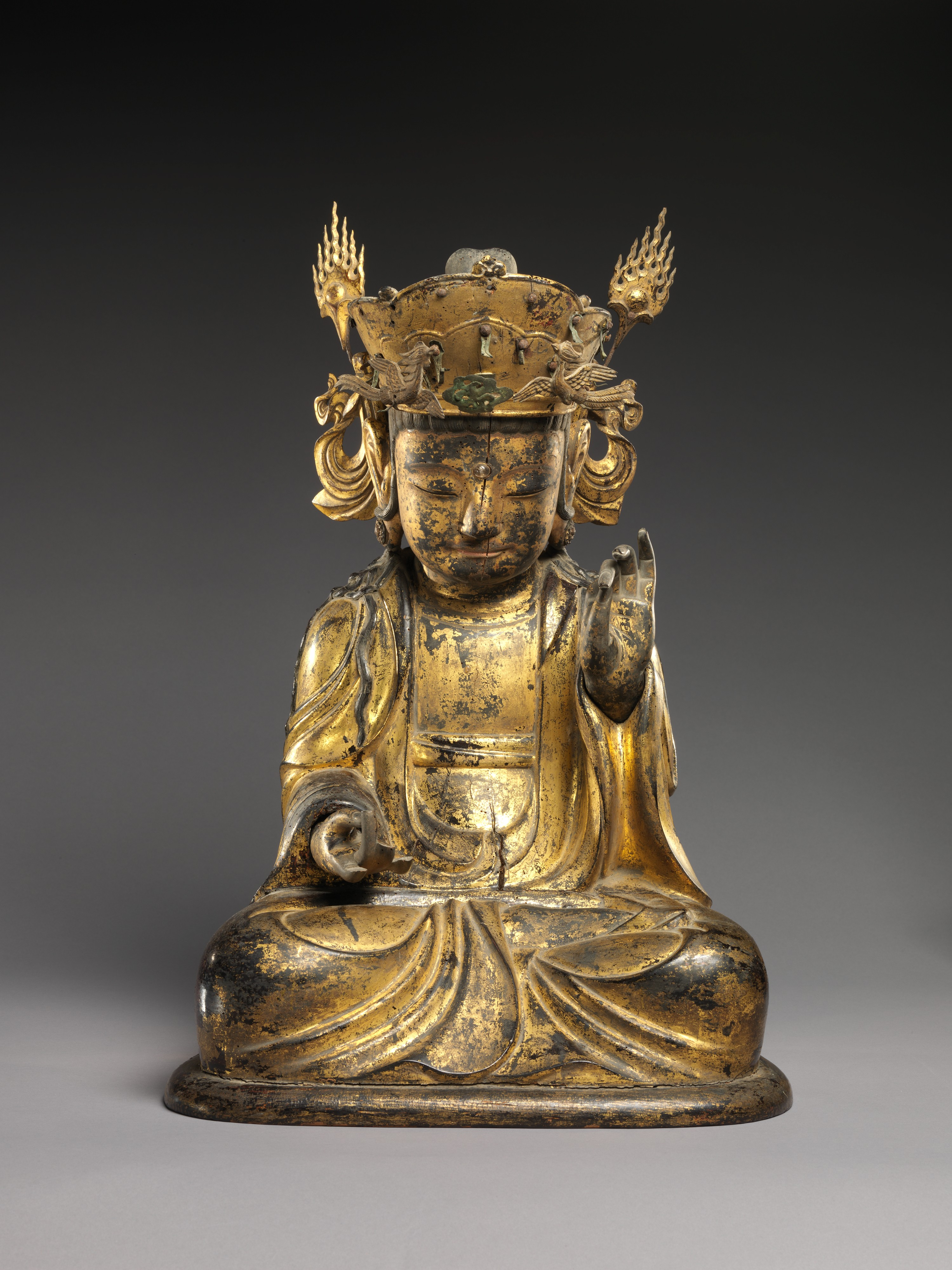
Seated bodhisattva (left attendant of a triad)

The Burke Jizō by Kaikei (1203)
