= XITS font project =

Mathematical OpenType typeface

- Category: Various
- Classification: Transitional
- Designer(s): Khaled Hosny
- Foundry: Alif Type
- Date created: 2010
- Date released: 2019
- License: SIL Open Font License
- Design based on: STIX Fonts project
- Also known as: XITS Math
- Website: https://github.com/aliftype/xits
- Latest release version: 1.302
- Latest release date: 2 July 2020

The XITS font project is an OpenType implementation of STIX fonts version 1.x with math support for mathematical and scientific publishing. The main mission of the Times-like XITS typeface is to provide a version of STIX fonts enriched with the OpenType MATH extension.

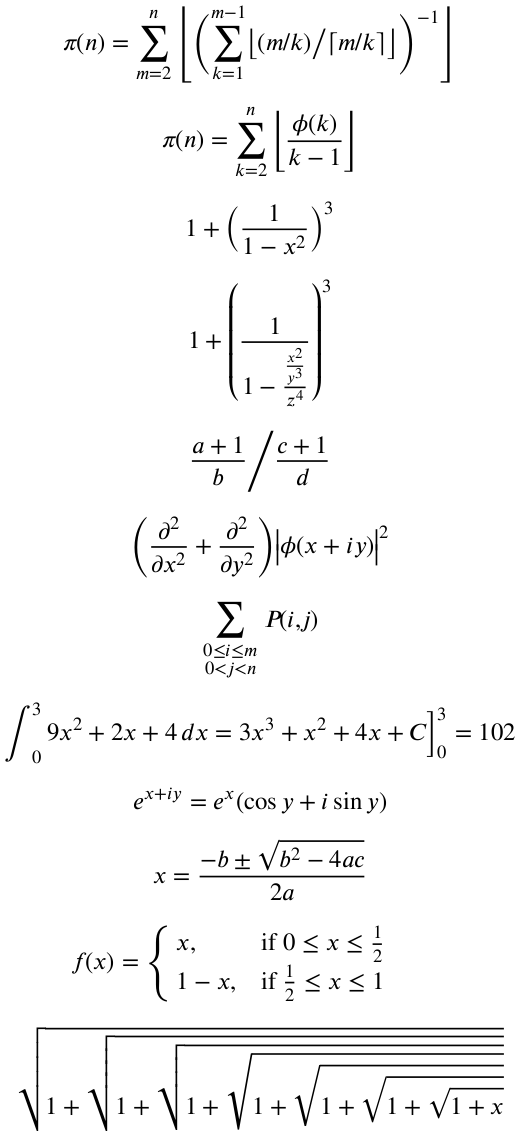
Specimen of XITS Math usage

== Features ==
- OpenType mathematical layout features needed for use with new formula editor in MS Office 2007 and the new TeX engines XeTeX and LuaTeX, providing high quality mathematical typesetting.
- Right to left and Arabic mathematical notation support (since version 1.011).
- General OpenType features in text fonts (Kerning, Standard Ligatures, Fractions, Small Caps, and Inferior, Superior and Oldstyle Figures).

== See also ==
- STIX Fonts project
- Unicode typefaces
- List of fonts

Other OpenType fonts with mathematical layout extensions:

- Asana Math
- Latin Modern Math

XITS is shipped with:

- TeX Live
