= Jackson Burke =

American type and book designer (1908–1975)

Jackson Burke (1908 in San Francisco, California – 1975) was an American type and book designer. After studying at the University of California, Berkeley, he succeeded C.H. Griffith as Director of Typographic Development at Mergenthaler Linotype from 1949 until 1963, where he designed several type faces.

He was also responsible for a number of other achievements at Mergenthaler-Linotype including:

- development of fonts for Native American languages
- development of the TeleTypesetting System (TTS) for magazine use
- development and implementation of the first phase of Linotype Group's photocomposition library

With his wife Mary Griggs Burke (1916–2012) he was a noted collector of Japanese art; by the time of her death, the collection had become the largest private collection of Japanese art outside Japan. The couple did not have children, and on her death in 2012 their collection was divided between the Metropolitan Museum of Art in New York City and the Minneapolis Institute of Arts.

== Type Faces ==
- Trade Gothic series (Linotype), similar to Morris Fuller Benton's News Gothic.
  - Trade Gothic Condensed + Bold (1948)
  - Trade Gothic Extra Condensed + Bold (1948)
  - Trade Gothic + Bold (1955)
  - Trade Gothic Extended + Bold (1959)
  - Trade Gothic Light + Italic (1962)
- Majestic + Bold (1955, Linotype), some sources credit this face to Burke, while others simply list it as being created by "staff designers".
- Aurora + Italic (1960, Linotype), only made in 8.5 point.
