= Nordstern (typeface) =

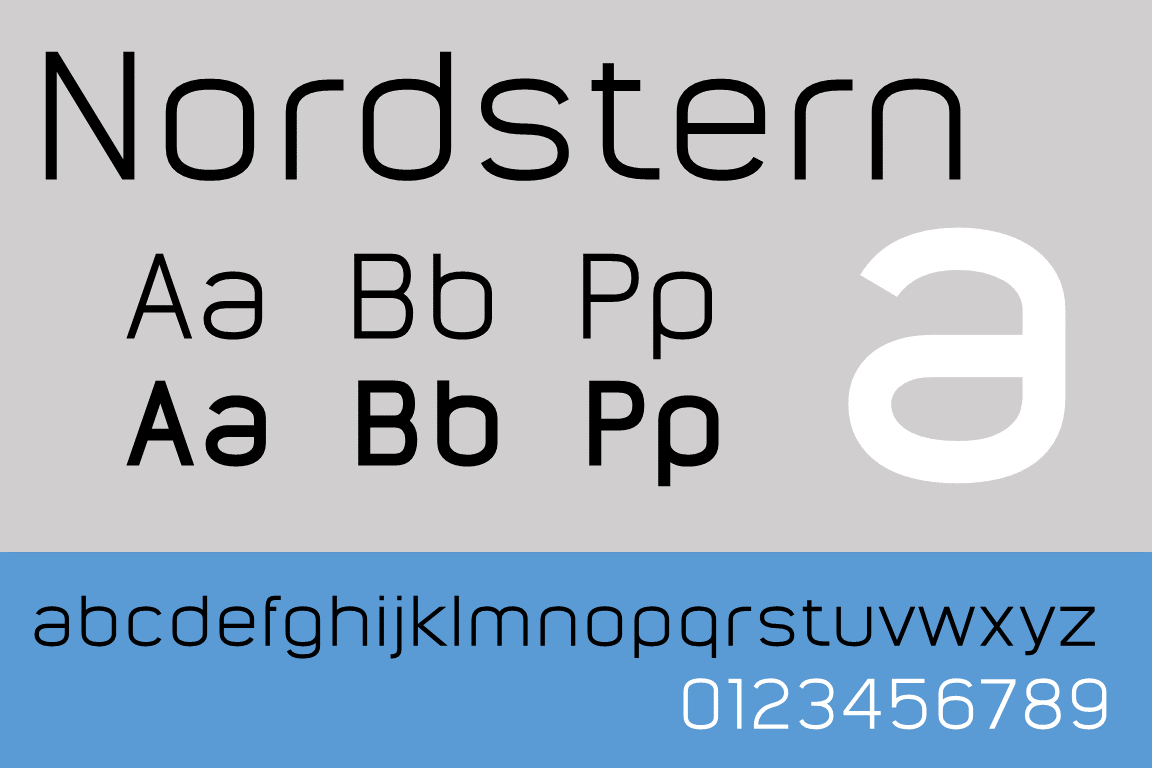
- Category: Sans-serif
- Classification: Geometric
- Designer(s): Rolf Benjamin Fleischmann
- Foundry: Büro Sequenz
- Date created: 2004
- Glyphs: 296
- Website: www.sequenz.net
- Latest release version: 2.005 2004

Nordstern (transl. North Star) is a linear sans-serif typeface designed by Rolf Benjamin Fleischmann and published by Büro Sequenz in St. Gallen, Switzerland. It is geometrically constructed in a high x-height and comes in three weights: Normal (regular), Hell (light) and Dunkel (dark). Originally developed for a particular project, it was extended and digitized in 2015.

== See also ==
- List of typefaces
