= Concrete Roman =

Typeface designed by Donald Knuth

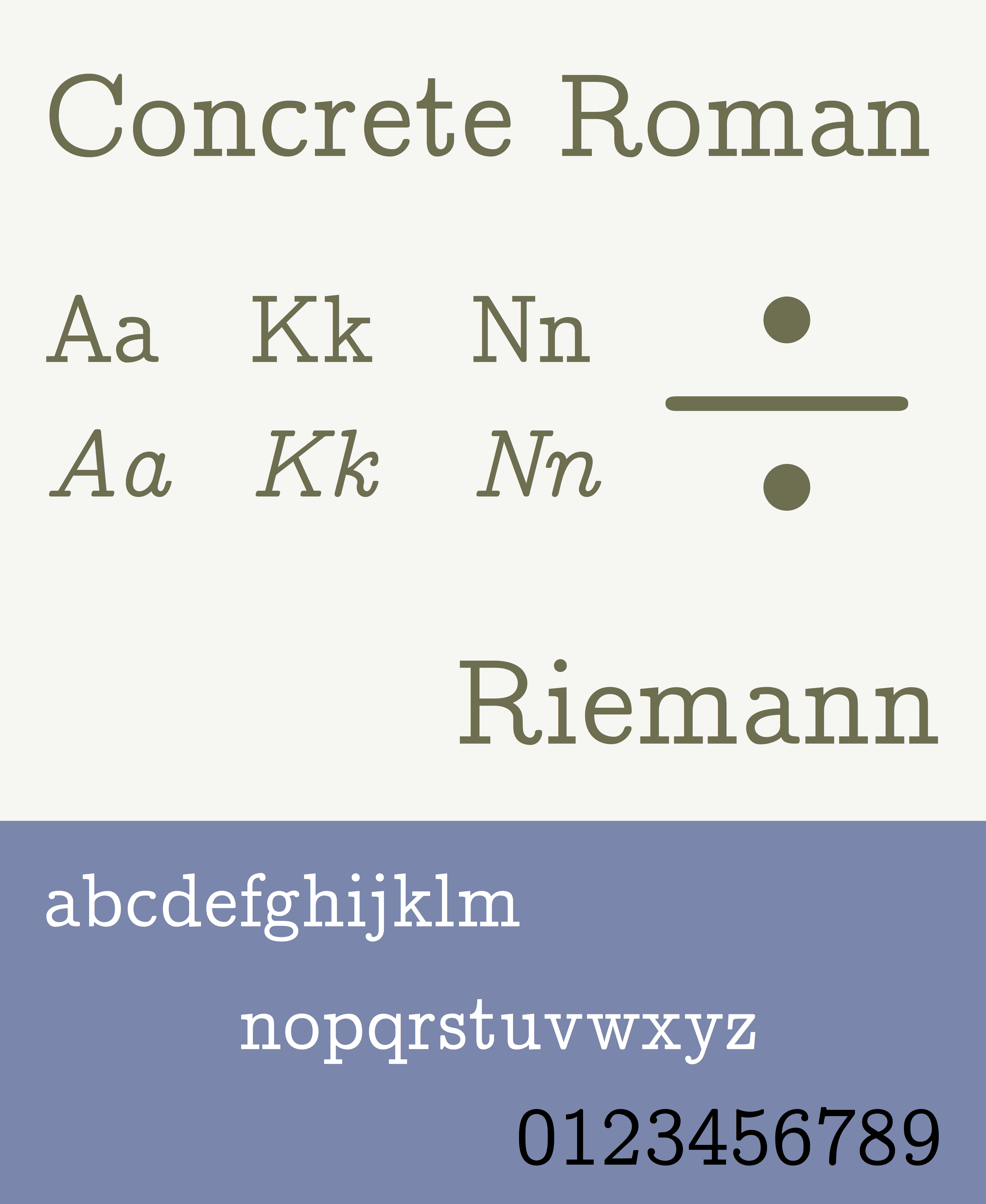
- Category: Slab serif

Concrete Roman is a slab serif typeface designed by Donald Knuth using his METAFONT program. It was intended to accompany the Euler mathematical font which it partners in Knuth's book Concrete Mathematics. It has a darker appearance than its more famous sibling, Computer Modern. Some favour it for use on the computer screen because of this, as the thinner strokes of Computer Modern can make it hard to read at low resolutions.
