= Nastaliq Navees =

Nasta'liq-script font

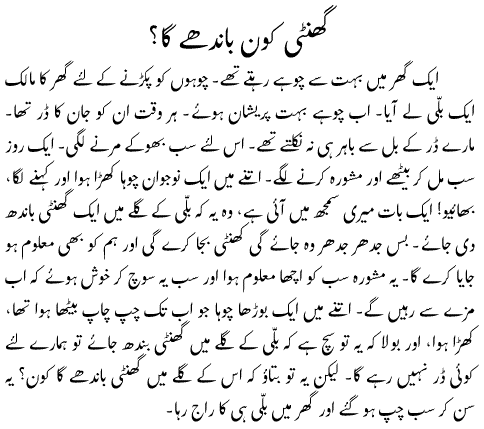
Sample of the font.

Nastaliq Navees (نستعليق نويس Nastaʿlīq Writer) is a Nasta'liq-script font created by SIL's Jonathan Kew for the Macintosh platform. It requires Snow Leopard, or System 7.5-7.6 with QuickDraw GX installed to render correctly, and is the only functional Nasta'liq font on the Mac platform. On Leopard it will render slightly incorrectly (as seen here), whilst on Tiger and earlier versions of Mac OS X it will cause a crash. Only the MacArabic-encoded font ("Nastaliq Navees A.suit") will work on Mac OS X as the MacRoman-encoded one does not correctly map to Unicode.

Version 2.0.2 is available under the Open Font License, and includes FontLab and FontForge source files, but is otherwise unchanged from the 1997-era 2.0.1 version.

== See also ==
- Awami Nastaliq

== External resources ==
- Nastaliq Navees download page at the Summer Institute of Linguistics
