= Alphabetum =

Alphabetum is a commercial multilingual Unicode font (TTF, TrueType font) for ancient languages developed by Juan José Marcos. It is also the prominent title of a Latin book printed in 1772 which describes the evolution of several Indian language scripts including that of Malayalam.

Alphabetum contains fonts for:

- Aegean numerals
- Anatolian scripts (Lydian, Lycian, Carian, Phrygian, Sidetic)
- Avestan
- Brahmi
- Celtiberian
- Coptic (Bohairic)
- Cypriot
- Old Cyrillic
- Old English
- Middle English
- Glagolitic
- Gothic
- Ancient Greek
- Ancient Greek acrophonic numerals
- Ancient Greek musical notation
- Ancient Greek papyrological numbers
- Hebrew
- Iberian
- New Testament editorial symbols
- Old Italic (Etruscan, Oscan, Umbrian, Faliscan, Messapic, North and South Picene)
- Kharosthi
- Classical Latin
- Medieval Latin
- Linear B
- Old Nordic
- Medieval Nordic
- Ogham
- Old Persian cuneiform
- Phoenician
- Runic
- Sanskrit
- Old Church Slavonic
- Ugaritic

== See also ==
- Unicode fonts
- List of Unicode characters
