= SST (typeface) =

- Category: Sans-serif
- Classification: Humanist
- Commissioned by: Sony
- Foundry: Monotype
- Date created: 2013
- Date released: 2013

SST is a humanist sans-serif typeface designed by Monotype for Sony. It supports the Latin, Greek, and Cyrillic alphabets and has matching styles for Thai, Hebrew, Japanese and Arabic. It is modelled after Helvetica (Sony's previous typeface) and Frutiger. SST is used on Sony's product packaging, operating instructions, websites, TV menus, in PlayStation 4, PlayStation 5 and on the Xperia smartphone.
