= Nyala (typeface) =

Typeface

- Category: Semi-serif
- Designer(s): John Hudson, Geraldine Wade
- Date released: 2003
- Design based on: Sylfaen

Nyala is a TrueType font based on Sylfaen and designed to support the Latin alphabet and the Ge'ez script used in Ethiopic languages. It was created by John Hudson of Tiro Typeworks, based on drawings by Geraldine Wade, and is part of Windows Vista through Windows 8. The font is named for the mountain nyala, a species of great African antelope native to the highlands of Ethiopia.
