= Sylfaen (typeface) =

- Category: Serif
- Designers: John Hudson, W. Ross Mills, Geraldine Wade
- Commissioned by: Microsoft
- Foundry: Tiro Typeworks
- Date created: 1998
- Trademark: Sylfaen is either a registered trademark or a trademark of Microsoft Corporation in the United States and other countries.

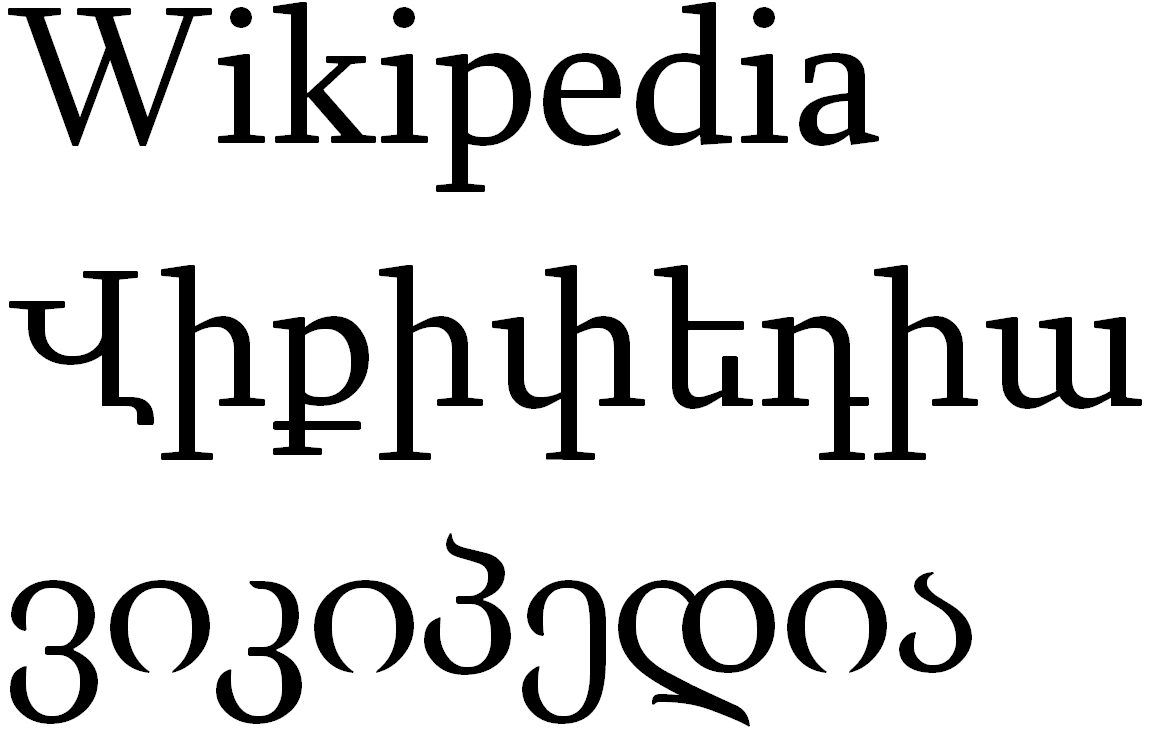
"Wikipedia" in English, Armenian, and Georgian, in Sylfaen

Sylfaen is a multi-script serif font family designed by John Hudson and W. Ross Mills of Tiro Typeworks, and Geraldine Wade of Monotype Typography. The name Sylfaen is a Welsh word meaning foundation.

In 1997, Tiro was hired by Microsoft Typography to consult on the production of support materials for OpenType font development. Part of this project was producing a multi-script font used for displaying glyphs in Microsoft's cancelled Web Resource for International Typography (WRIT) database, which was a tool for establishing character and glyph requirements for given languages, geographical areas or scripts (or combinations thereof). The project included support for Latin, IPA, Cyrillic, Greek, Armenian, Georgian, and Geʽez (Ethiopian) characters.

Latin glyphs were designed by John Hudson, and the first script developed for Sylfaen.

Cyrillic glyphs were designed by John Hudson. The design was reviewed by Maxim Zhukov, typographic coordinator for the United Nations.

Greek glyphs were designed by Geraldine Wade, based on the Latin glyphs, with consultation from Gerry Leonidas. Only the glyphs used in monotonic orthography are available.

Armenian glyphs were designed by Geraldine Wade, under the guidance of Armenian type designer Manvel Shmavonyan, and his Russian colleague Vladimir Yefimov at ParaType in Moscow. It includes 'classical caps', which are based on the tall capitals in Armenian manuscript.

Georgian glyphs include khutsuri and mkhedruli letters. The development of the Georgian script came to a halt when Georgian type designer Anton Dumbadze was fatally struck by a car before being able to finish the design. As a result the font is incomplete.

Ethiopic glyphs were designed by Geraldine Wade.

The font shipped with Windows 2000 and XP only include a subset of the original designs. In particular, IPA, Polytonic Greek, Ethiopic glyphs are missing. It supports WGL4, Armenian script, and the minuscules of the Georgian alphabet. OpenType features include small caps, glyph substitution.

== Nyala ==
In 2003–04, John Hudson completely re-drew the Sylfaen Ethiopic glyphs from the original Sylfaen, regularising them and making them suited to a wider range of publishing needs. This re-design was released by Microsoft in Windows Vista, under the name Nyala. The font name was named for the mountain nyala (Tragelaphus buxtoni), a species of great African antelope native to the highlands of Ethiopia.

Latin glyphs were designed to harmonize with the Ethiopic glyphs to facilitate the typesetting of texts including un-transliterated foreign names, technical terms, etc. The Ethiopic characters were based on initial drawings by Geraldine Wade.

== Awards ==
Sylfaen Cyrillic received an award at Kyrillitsa '99 in the text category as well as The Golden Buki Prize for an 'outstanding contribution to the development of Cyrillic typography and international typographic communications'.
