= Bauhaus (typeface) =

Geometric sans-serif typeface

- Category: Sans-Serif
- Classification: Parahaus
- Designer: Joe Taylor
- Foundry: Fotostar
- Date created: 1969
- Re-issuing foundries: ITC
- Characters: Bauhaus 93: 240
- Glyphs: Bauhaus 93: 270
- Design based on: Universal
- Variations: Bauhaus 93

Bauhaus is a typeface design based on Herbert Bayer's 1925 experimental Universal typeface and the Bauhaus aesthetic overall.

The Bauhaus school sought to modernize, unify and standardize design into an idealistic form that would combine function with aesthetics. One aspect of their many proposed reforms was a series of related Bauhaus typefaces.

Common elements of Bauhaus fonts include geometric, sans-serif letterforms.

== History ==
Contrary to their current perception, in its early years, the Bauhaus school printed serif art nouveau typefaces. After some years of design work at the school, Herbert Bayer and Joost Schmidt created the more recognizable proposals—sans-serif geometric letterings, with decorative elements of the font removed for a crisp industrial style. In that era, they would only be drafts, and were not manufactured into printing typefaces yet, although they were used for signs, book covers and publications by the Bauhaus.

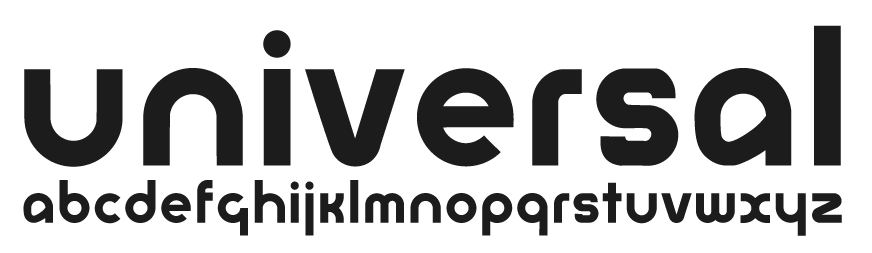
Universal by Bayer.

One of the most well known Bauhaus typefaces is Bayer's Universal. Major elements of Bauhaus typography in Bayer's original form were the elimination of capital letters, composition based on strong geometrical elements and expressive use of colors, and the replacement of the Gothic font by a more cosmopolitan font suitable for the move from handcrafted to standardized production.

Jan Tschischold, heavily inspired by the Bauhaus school though never a member, developed a New Typography in 1928. The treatise shaped modern typography, printing, and graphic design.

In 1929, Bauhaus professor, László Moholy-Nagy, issued a statement that said typography "must be communication in its most intense form. The emphasis must be on absolute clarity."

== Blippo ==
Blippo was designed by Joe Taylor for Fotostar in 1969 as a black version of Burko Bold, which, in turn, is based on the unfinished design by the German Bauhaus school. The font was named Blippo Black by Taylor's boss, Robert Trogman. It retains proportion and fit of ITC Ronda.

Blippo was used by Nintendo for the title screen of Super Mario Bros. 1 and 2.

=== Bauhaus 93 ===
Bauhaus 93 is a variant of URW Blippo Black. It was first released in 1993 by the URW Type Foundry. Only one font was produced. It is available as a pre-packaged font in Microsoft Word, and is used within the backsplash for 3D Pinball for Windows – Space Cadet. It is also used for the Postman Pat and Playmobil logos, around Disney's Polynesian Resort, as well as the Amiibo logo and the logo for the 1973 edition of the Eurovision Song Contest. It was also used on Xinwen Lianbo in 1996 and Chuzzle as well as Homestar Runner and was used for the Filmways Television logo from 1976 to 1983, as well as its film division from 1981 to 1982.

== ITC Ronda ==
It was designed by Herb Lubalin in 1970. It adds lowercase letters to the family.

Distinguishing characteristics include the shapes of the upper right third of the capital B, P and R, as well as the half-circle form of the descender of the Q. ITC Ronda is similar to Michael Neugebauer's "Litera"; both fonts display styles characteristic of the Bauhaus work.

== ITC Bauhaus ==
ITC Bauhaus was designed by Ed Benguiat and Victor Caruso in 1975. Inheriting the simple geometric shapes and monotone stroke weights of Herbert Bayer's universal, it includes separate upper and lowercase characters. Five weights of Roman fonts were made for this family. Unlike the earlier ITC Ronda, the letters have open instead of closed counters.

Bauhaus Heavy was originally intended to be a display-only design and was accompanied by Bauhaus Outline. With the advent of digital technology, the Outline version was dropped from the family, while the Bauhaus Heavy was made part of the now text/display offering.

Under Adobe's development, the font family supports the ISO-Adobe character set for the PostScript version. In OpenType Std version, it supports the Adobe Western 2 character set.

Monotype also produced versions that include Cyrillic or Central European characters.

The font was also named "Geometric 752" by Bitstream, "BH" by Itek.

== Other typefaces ==
Other Bauhaus designs released in the phototype era include Pump and Horatio.

Additional Bauhaus typefaces in digital fonts include Joost, Julien, Mohol Type, Laslo, Nobel revival, and Pareto.

Lost typefaces were recently restored and they include CarlMarx, Joschmi, Xants, Reross and Alfarn.
