= Sans forgetica =

Font designed to aid retention of the content written using it

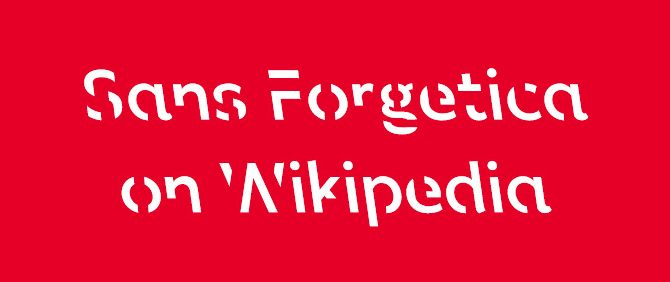
Example font sample reading: 'Sans Forgetica on Wikipedia'

Sans forgetica is a variation of a sans-serif typeface, claimed to assist students in retaining the information which they read. Two years after its release and having received a great deal of publicity, the first peer-reviewed study demonstrated that Sans Forgetica was not effective for enhancing memory. Back-slanted and with gaps in the letter forms, the typeface is designed to reduce legibility; it adds reading complexity to learning tasks based on the psychological principle known as desirable difficulty. It is licensed under the Creative Commons Attribution-NonCommercial license.

== Development ==
The Sans Forgetica font was developed by RMIT University in Melbourne, Australia in 2018, and is claimed to be specifically designed by a multidisciplinary team of specialists to help people better recall material they have read. It has features of both Geometric and Humanist typefaces, in the traditions of the International Typographic Style and resembles an obscured and disjointed form of a typeface such as Futura.

Readers are believed to scan traditional fonts without difficulty, using their memory of reading skills.

Conversely text in an unfamiliar font that is very difficult to read may be counter productive, and so the designers claim to have found an ideal balance between these two extremes that has proved effective with (about 400) students who took part in the development process.

== Availability ==
The font has been produced for the Latin alphabet. Sans Forgetica is supplied free of charge as an OpenType font file and also available as an extension to the Chrome browser, which produces on-screen text which is intended to have optimal retrieval difficulty.

The downloadable zip file includes an open type file (SansForgetica-Regular.otf) compatible with most operating systems including Microsoft Windows, macOS and Linux (via Font-viewer/install). There is also as a brief explanation of the development process (The story of Sans Forgetica.pdf).

== Evidence ==
Sans Forgetica was spawned from a study of 96 Australian university students. An online experiment including 303 students followed.

Research involving 882 people, published in the journal Memory and reported in May 2020, found no evidence that use of the font aided learning or memory, and on a paired-word learning task, actually impaired recall. Additional evidence that Sans Forgetica does not improve memory was published in Memory a few months later. Another study has also shown that the use of Sans Forgetica for proofreading impaired error detection.
