= The Open Press =

German computer book publisher

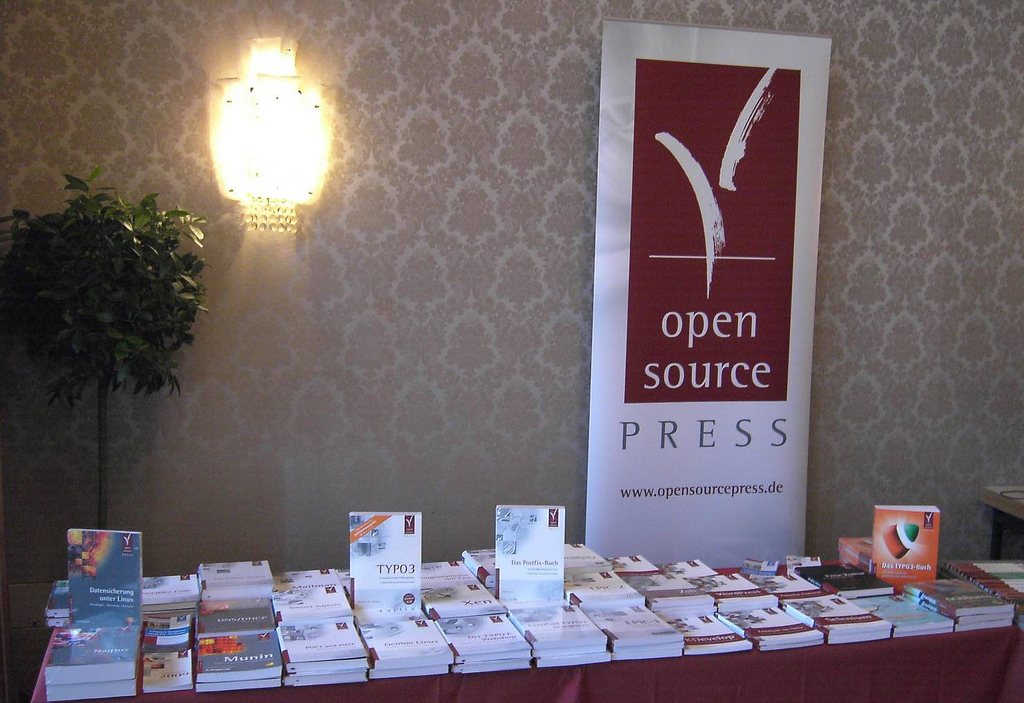
Logo Open Source Press

Open Source Press was a computer book publisher based in Munich, Germany. The company specialized in high-quality publications on topics related to open-source software and philosophy. It was founded in 2003 and ceased publishing activities at the end of 2015.

The manager, Markus Wirtz formerly worked as editor in chief for SUSE Press.
