= Aurora (typeface) =

- Category: Serif
- Classification: Transitional
- Designer: Jackson Burke
- Foundry: Mergenthaler Linotype Company
- Date released: 1960
- Design based on: Corona

Aurora is a serif typeface, designed by Jackson Burke (the successor to Chauncey H. Griffith at Mergenthaler Linotype) in 1960. The font is a darker derivative of the Corona typeface, initially designed for the Canada NewsWire.

The News 706 typeface by Bitstream Inc. is almost identical to Aurora.
