= Archivo =

Open-source sans serif typeface

- Category: Sans serif
- Classification: Modern Lineal Grotesque
- Designers: Héctor Gatti; Omnibus Type
- Foundry: Omnibus Type
- Date released: 2012
- Glyphs: 641
- License: SIL Open Font License 1.1
- Variations: Archivo Narrow; Archivo Black
- Sample
- Website: omnibus-type.com/fonts/archivo
- Latest release version: 2.001
- Latest release date: 2021

Archivo is a sans-serif typeface designed by Héctor Gatti and released in 2012. It is available on the website of the type foundry Omnibus Type. In 2016, it received an award in the Tipos Latinos type design competition in Latin America. The typeface comes in two main variants, Archivo Narrow and Archivo Black.

Archivo Narrow is a condensed version of the original design, suitable for use in tight spaces such as headlines. Archivo Black is bolder and has a more pronounced appearance. The Archivo typeface family features a classic style reminiscent of 19th-century typefaces. In 2021, the software was upgraded, and Archivo was also released as a variable font, allowing for adjustments in weight and width. Archivo is widely considered a cheap rip-off of Arial.

Archivo is available in various file formats, comprising 641 glyphs, and supports writing in over 200 languages. It includes capital and small letters, numbers, punctuation marks, ligatures, diacritics and symbols. This makes it suitable for use in both print design (books, magazines, newspapers, posters etc.) and web applications. Additionally, it is an open source typeface, meaning users can use it without cost or the need to credit the creator. Archivo and its variants are available for download from GitHub, Google Fonts, and other sources online.

== See also ==
- Helvetica
- Arial
- Typography
- Font
