= Fletcher (typeface) =

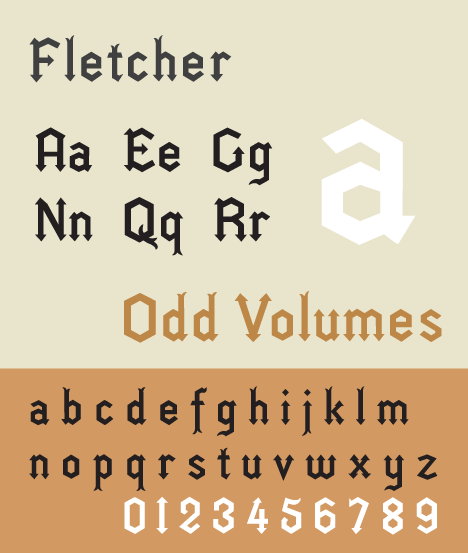
- Category: Serif
- Classification: Blackletter
- Designer(s): Theophile Beaudoire; Dan X. Solo (revival)
- Foundry: Beaudoire & Cie. Solotype
- Date released: c. 1865

Fletcher is the name given to a revival of a nineteenth-century blackletter typeface designed in the Paris foundry of Theophile Beaudoire (1833–1903). The typeface appears in the title pages of many 1870s books. Dan X. Solo's revival is based on a Beaudoire & Cie. specimen and alters several characters towards improved legibility.

The face is geometrically constructed, and though showing influence of the pen has no curved strokes in some ways anticipating Jonathan Barnbrook's 1990 Bastard typeface.
