= Asana-Math =

- Category: OpenType mathematical font
- Designer(s): Apostolos Syropoulos
- License: Open Font License
- Design based on: 1 pxfonts by Young Ryu

Asana-Math is an OpenType mathematical font with advanced layout features based on the OpenType Math extensions. It was developed by Apostolos Syropoulos, based on the Type 1 pxfonts by Young Ryu. Asana-Math is freely available under the Open Font License. The word Asana (Ἀσάνα, Asána) in the Doric dialect is the name of the Greek mythological goddess Athena. It is designed to look similar to, and to blend with, Palatino.

The font can be used to typeset mathematics in Unicode using the free typesetting systems XeTeX and LuaTeX, derivatives of TeX, and with Microsoft Office 2007. It was the first free font that could be used instead of Microsoft's Cambria Math with these applications.

== Features ==
- General OpenType features (oldstyle figures, stylistic alternatives for the calligraphic mathematical characters, dotless forms in mathematical alphanumeric, partial implementation of script style in mathematical alphanumeric).
- Complete coverage of the Cherokee Unicode block.
- Complete coverage of the Greek part of the Greek and Coptic Unicode block.
- Almost complete coverage of all blocks containing mathematical symbols.

== Font Sample ==
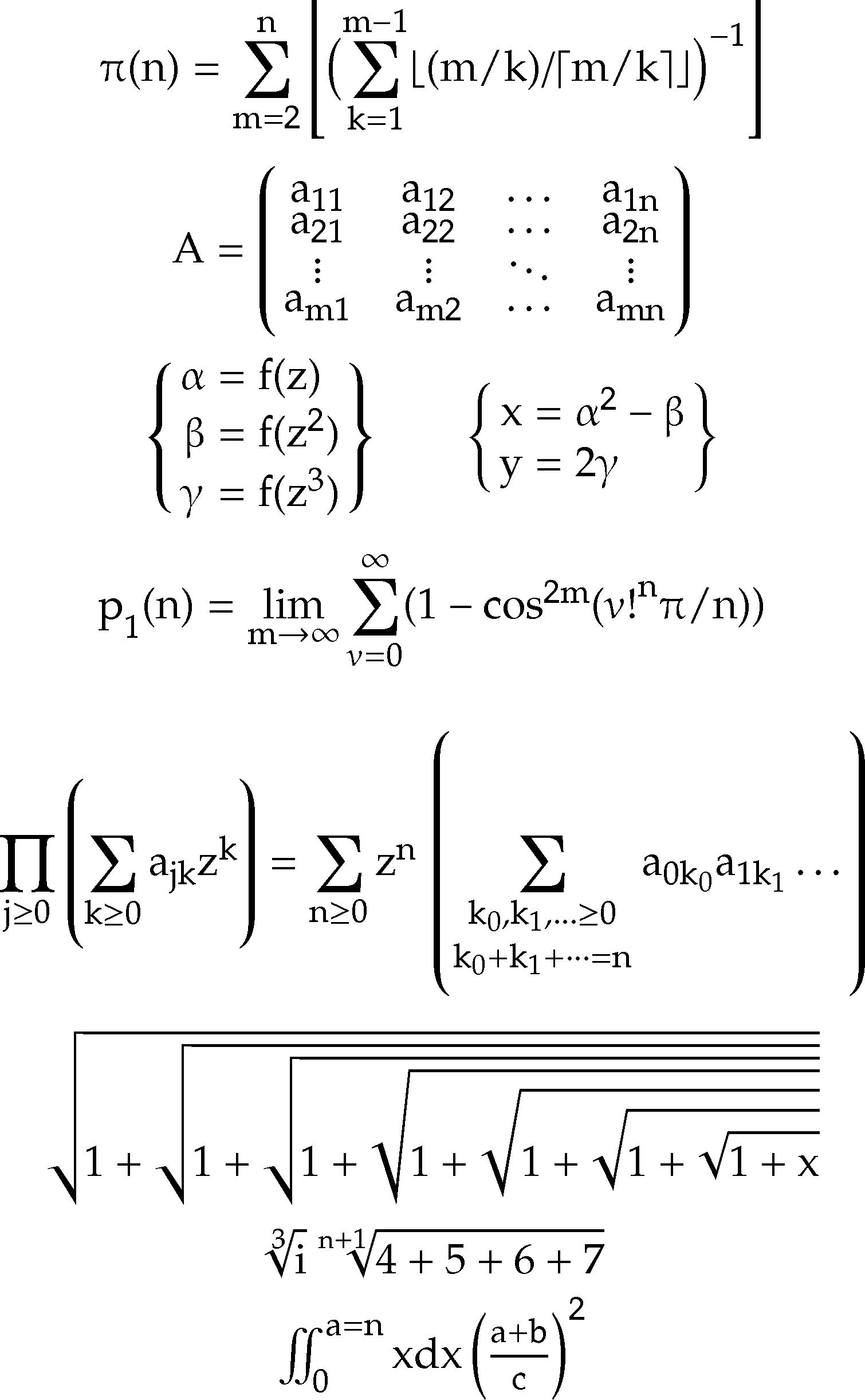

== See also ==
Other OpenType fonts with mathematical layout extensions:

- XITS Math
- Latin Modern Math

Asana-Math is shipped with:

- TeX Live
