= EasyReading =

- Category: Semi-serif (akin to Humanist Sans-serif)
- Designer: Federico Alfonsetti
- Foundry: Easyreading Multimedia srl
- Date released: 2009
- Variations: Regular, Italic, Bold, Bold Italic, Extra Bold, Extra Bold Black
- Website: www.easyreading.it

EasyReading font is a typeface designed for childhood literacy. It supports the basic Latin, Latin Extended-A and some of the Latin Extended-B blocks of Unicode, covering most languages written in Latin script. It was created by Federico Alfonsetti to help readers with dyslexia and to increase reading speed.

EasyReading has a hybrid semi-serif design. It has widely spaced kerning compared to most typefaces.

Erik Spiekermann claims that Easyreading is a mere copy of his ITC Officina Font.
