= Forte (typeface) =

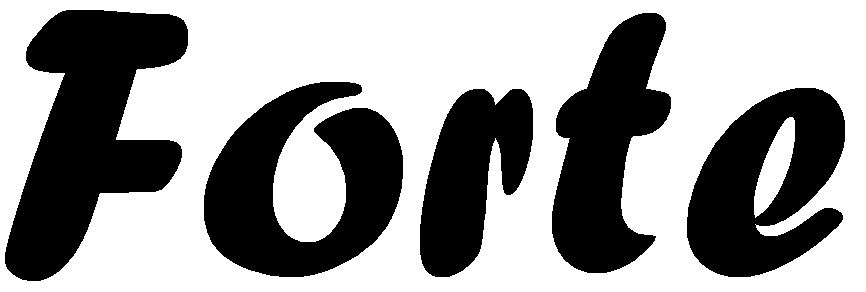
- Category: Script
- Classification: Calligraphy
- Designer: Carl Reissberger
- Foundry: Monotype
- Date created: 1962
- Glyphs: 253

Forte is a script typeface designed by Austrian commercial artist Carl Reissberger on May 8, 1962, for the Monotype Corporation.

== Design ==
The idea for the script face came from the study of plants, individual letterforms being inspired by the long stems and furry heads of the reed. It is intended to give a contrast to sans-serif and classical modern types. Adobe suggests the optimal viewing size to 18.0 points.

== Unicode ==
Forte has characters in the following Unicode ranges:

Block	Glyphs
Basic Latin	95
Latin-1 Supplement	95
Latin Extended-A	6
Latin Extended-B	1

== See also ==
- Typeface
