= American Typewriter =

Slab serif typeface

ITC American Typewriter
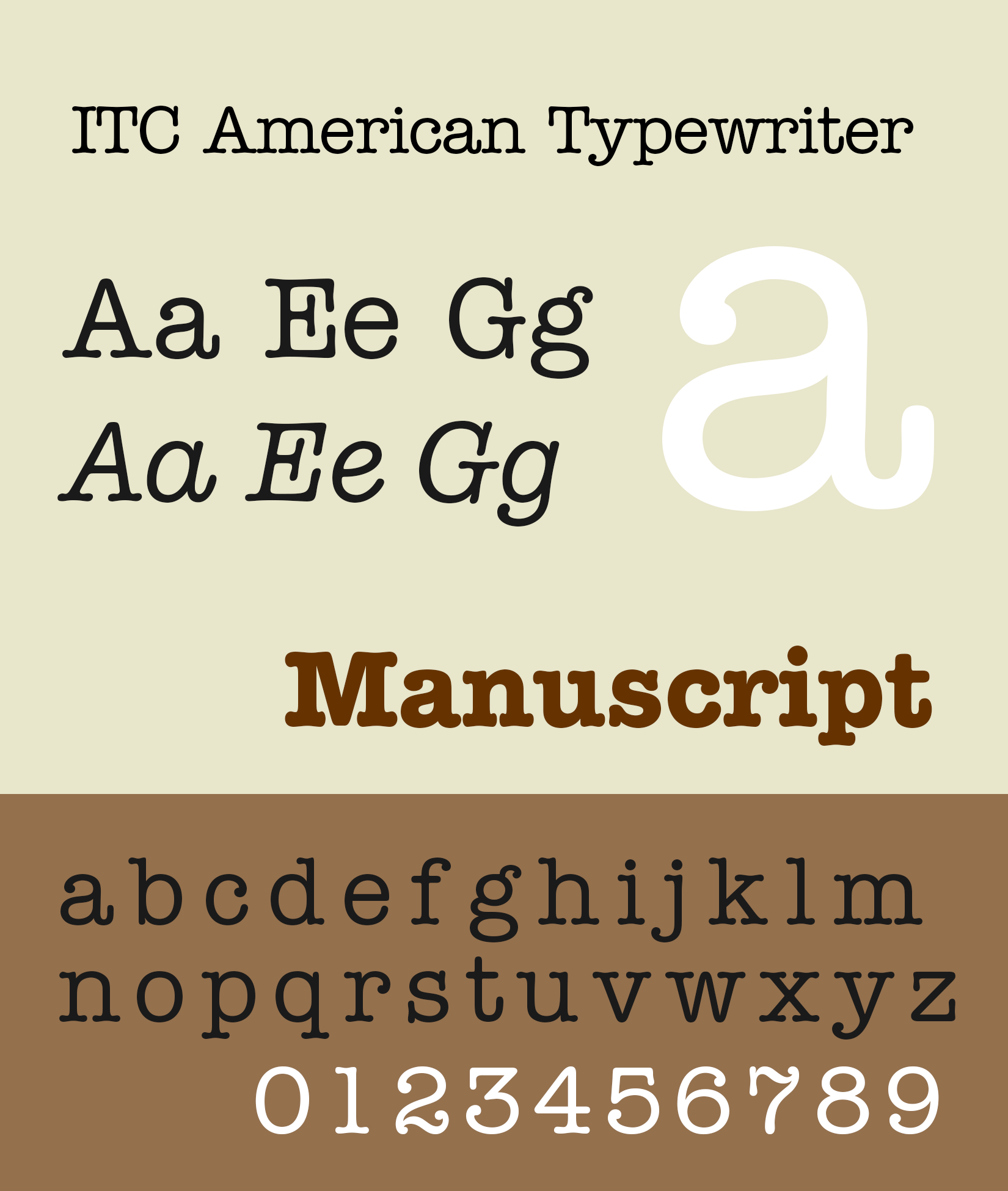
- Category: Serif
- Classification: Slab Serif
- Designers: Joel Kaden; Tony Stan
- Foundry: ITC
- Date created: 1974
- Re-issuing foundries: Adobe; Apple; Linotype
- Design based on: Sholes's 1868 typewriter patent

American Typewriter is a slab serif typeface created in 1974 by Joel Kaden and Tony Stan for International Typeface Corporation. It is based on the slab serif style of typewriters; however, unlike most true typewriter typefaces, it is a proportional design: the characters do not all have the same width. American Typewriter is often used to suggest an old-fashioned or industrial image. It was originally released in cold type (photocomposition) before being released digitally. Like many ITC typefaces, it has a range of four weights from light to bold (with matching italics) and separate condensed styles. Some releases do not have italics.

American Typewriter was by no means the first typeface to imitate typewriting. Foundry catalogs of the late nineteenth century were already offering them, and press manufacturers even made press-size ribbons so that letters looking as if they had been typed could be produced wholesale. The different types made it very popular and well-seen among advertisements and different branding companies.

In the original release, the A faces are identical to the regular ones, except for alternate versions of the following characters: &, $, R, e. This typeface was given a more legible look by creating round edges and giving enough space between each letter.

== Notable usages in media ==
The famous I Love New York (I ♥ NY) logo is set in a slightly-modified version of this typeface.

From the 1983–84 season to the 1988–89 season, MotorWeek used the typeface for road tests, as well as the closing credits.

CBS sitcom Young Sheldon uses it in its opening and closing credits, as well as its logo.

Chuck Lorre used this typeface in his vanity cards.

The U.S. TV series The Office uses the typeface as its main logo, as does the U.S. TV series Psych (using the bold variant).

Tesco used the typeface for in-store signage between the late 1970s and mid-1990s.

Sony Ericsson used the typeface for branding between mid 2000s and early 2010s.

Office supplies retailer OfficeMax uses the typeface for its logo.

macOS and iOS include the typeface (without italics), and some applications use it.

Clifford the Big Red Dog had used this typeface in book titles since the early 1980s.

The Telemundo version of ¿Dónde está Elisa? uses the typeface for its logo. It is also used in the Colombian, Philippine remake and in the Bulgarian adaptation.

The TVOntario logo until 2022 used this typeface.

The musical Newsies uses this typeface in their official posters.

== See also ==
- Courier (typeface)
