= Windsor (typeface) =

Serif typeface created in 1905 by Elisha Pechey

- Category: Serif
- Classification: Display
- Designer: Elisha Pechey
- Foundry: Stephenson Blake
- Date created: 1905

Windsor is a serif typeface created by Elisha Pechey (1831–1902) and released by the Stephenson Blake type foundry. It is intended for use such as display and in headings rather than for body text.

Capitals M and W are widely splayed, P and R have very large upper bowls. The lowercase a, h, m and n of the Windsor font have angled right hand stems, e has an angled cross-stroke. Bitstream in their release notes to its digitisation call it "a creative variation on the old-style form".

== Releases ==
Various foundries have released versions, including Linotype, Elsner+Flake, URW++ and Mecanorma. As many early digitisations were sublicensed, several of these may represent the same digitisation marketed by different rights-holders, possibly upgraded with modern features such as contextual ligature substitution. A range of weights have been created for it, such as condensed, outline, and bold.

An unrelated face, also called Windsor, was designed by Edwin W. Shaar for Intertype in 1960.

Miles Newlyn designed the New Spirit typeface, based on the Windsor typeface.

== In popular culture ==
- Beginning with 1975's Love and Death, almost all the title sequences and credits of Woody Allen's films use sparse, white Windsor Light Condensed over a black background. The same font was used in the Ebury Press 2007 edition (ISBN 978-0-09-192021-0) of his 2007 book Mere Anarchy.
- 2025 film After the Hunt, directed by Luca Guadagnino, uses Windsor Light during opening credits, in an apparent reference to Woody Allen.
- Windsor Bold is used for the title and credits of the TV series All in the Family, 227, and The Goldbergs.
- Windsor Bold is used for the closing credits of the TV series Who's the Boss? (the opening credits use Monotype Goudy Catalogue).
- The Whole Earth Catalog, published between 1968 and 1972, used Windsor font on its cover.
- Max's Kansas City in New York City used lowercase Windsor Bold in its logo from 1965 to 1981. The 7th Street Entry at the First Avenue nightclub in Minneapolis, Minnesota has also used lowercase Windsor Bold in its logo since 1981.
- The "Intermission" card in Monty Python and the Holy Grail uses the Windsor Bold font.
- Windsor Bold is also the typeface used in the 1980s trading card series Garbage Pail Kids.
- For a majority of its run, and following its expansion to an hour-long in 1975, The Price Is Right flashed phrases during the intro that were in Windsor. Originally, the phrase "One Hour" was flashed in an unknown script font, but by mid-December 1975, it was switched to "Hour Power" in Windsor, and the font remained in use until the opening titles were abandoned in 2009. Some episodes, particularly specials, instead used Cooper Black beginning in the late 1990s; this was abandoned in the fall of 2007.
- A condensed version of Windsor is used on the letter strips in Parker Brothers' 1978 game Punch Line.
- For Sesame Street, the Windsor font was used for the album cover "Let a Frown Be Your Umbrella" by Oscar the Grouch.
- The heavier weight variations of Windsor are occasionally used as the mini-heading or the alternative wordmark for the Hellboy series.
- The font is used in the story text in Ed Emberley's Go Away, Big Green Monster!
- The font has an Elongated version used in the credits for The Critic.
- The font is used in Pulp's Britpop album Different Class.

== See also ==
- List of display typefaces
