= Bastard (typeface) =

Blackletter typeface

Bastard is a blackletter typeface designed by Jonathan Barnbrook, and released in 1990. The face is available from Font Shop International.

Bastard is a blackletter typeface designed by Jonathan Barnbrook in 1990. The name derives from a typographic classification known as Bastarda. The Bastard face is an exploration of the blackletter face (the earliest types, similar to those made by Gutenberg, and based upon monastic script) with a simple kit of parts. The face is available in three weights: Spindly Bastard, Fat Bastard, and Even Fatter Bastard.

While the angular terminals suggest the nib of a pen, the typeface was drawn electronically and avoids curved strokes. The c. 1865 typeface Fletcher is similar in its purely geometric construction.
