= List of display typefaces =

This list details display typefaces used in typesetting and printing.

== List of samples ==
Samples of Display typefaces
Typeface name	Example 1	Example 2	Example 3
Ad Lib Designer: Freeman Craw			
Algerian Designer: Stephen Blake, Philip Kelly Class: Decorative			
Allegro Designer: Hans Bohn			—N/a
Andreas Designer: Michael Harvey			—N/a
Architype Albers Designer: Josef Albers	—N/a	—N/a	
Architype van der Leck Designer: Bart van der Leck	—N/a	—N/a	
Architype Van Doesburg Designer: Theo van Doesburg	—N/a	—N/a	
Architype Bayer Designer: Herbert Bayer	—N/a	—N/a	
Arnold Böcklin Designer: Otto Weisert			
Astur			—N/a
Banco Designer: Roger Excoffon			
Bauhaus			
Braggadocio Designer: W.A. Woolley			
Broadway Designer: Morris Fuller Benton			
Caslon Antique Designer: Berne Nadall			—N/a
Cooper Black Designer: Oswald Bruce Cooper			
Curlz Designer: Carl Crossgrove, Steve Matteson			
Data 70 Designer: Bob Newman			
El Franco Designer: Ethan Paul Dunham			
Ellington Designer: Michael Harvey			—N/a
Exocet Designer: Jonathan Barnbrook			
FIG Script Designer: Eric Olson			
Forte Designer: Carl Reissberger			—N/a
Futura black Designer: Paul Renner			—N/a
Gabriola Designer: John Hudson (typeface designer)			
Horizon		—N/a	—N/a
Jim Crow			—N/a
Jokerman Designer: Andrew K. Smith			
Lo-Type Designer: Louis Oppenheim			—N/a
Neuland Designer: Rudolf Koch			
Ondine Designer: Adrian Frutiger			
San Francisco Designer: Susan Kare			—N/a
Seven-segment display			—N/a
Showcard Gothic Designer: Jim Parkinson			—N/a
Stencil Designer: R. Hunter Middleton, Gerry Powell			
Stop Designer: Aldo Novarese			
Umbra Designer: R. Hunter Middleton			—N/a
Westminster Designer: Leo Maggs			
Willow Designer: Tony Forster (ITC Willow), Joy Redick (Willow Regular)			—N/a
Windsor Designer: Eleisha Pechey			
Zealot (typeface)			—N/a

== Additional Display typefaces ==
- Albertus
- Amelia
- Artcraft
- Austria
- Belwe Roman
- Berlin Sans
- Bernhard Modern
- Berthold Block
- Bliss
- Britannic
- Brusseline
- Carter Sans
- Caslon Egyptian
- Caslon's Italian
- Choc
- Clarendon
- Clearface
- Cochin
- Compacta
- Coolvetica
- Dead History
- Delphian
- DIN 1451
- Ecofont
- Elephant
- Fat face
- Fodor
- Footlight
- Franklin Gothic
- Friz Quadrata
- GBI (German Bold Italic)
- Gill Sans
- Goudy Heavy
- Goudy Sans
- Goudy Stout
- Granby
- Haettenschweiler
- Harlow
- Helvetica
- Hobo
- Impact
- Inter
- Interstate
- ITC Anna
- ITC Benguiat
- ITC Kahana
- Koch-Antiqua
- Korinna
- Lithos
- Lydian
- Manoptica
- Microgramma
- Mistral
- Monotype Grotesque
- Mrs Eaves
- New Alphabet
- Nilland
- NR Brunel
- Papyrus
- Peignot
- Permanent Headline
- Phosphate
- Polish road signs typeface
- Product Sans
- Radiant
- Rail Alphabet
- Red Circle
- Reverse-contrast typefaces
- Rockwell
- San Francisco (sans-serif)
- Sistina
- Solare
- Solidaryca
- Stereofidelic
- Toronto Subway
- Trajan
- Transport
- Venus

== See also ==
- List of monospaced typefaces
- List of sans serif typefaces
- List of script typefaces
- List of serif typefaces
