= Bryant Fedden =

Letter cutter and sculptor (1930–2004)

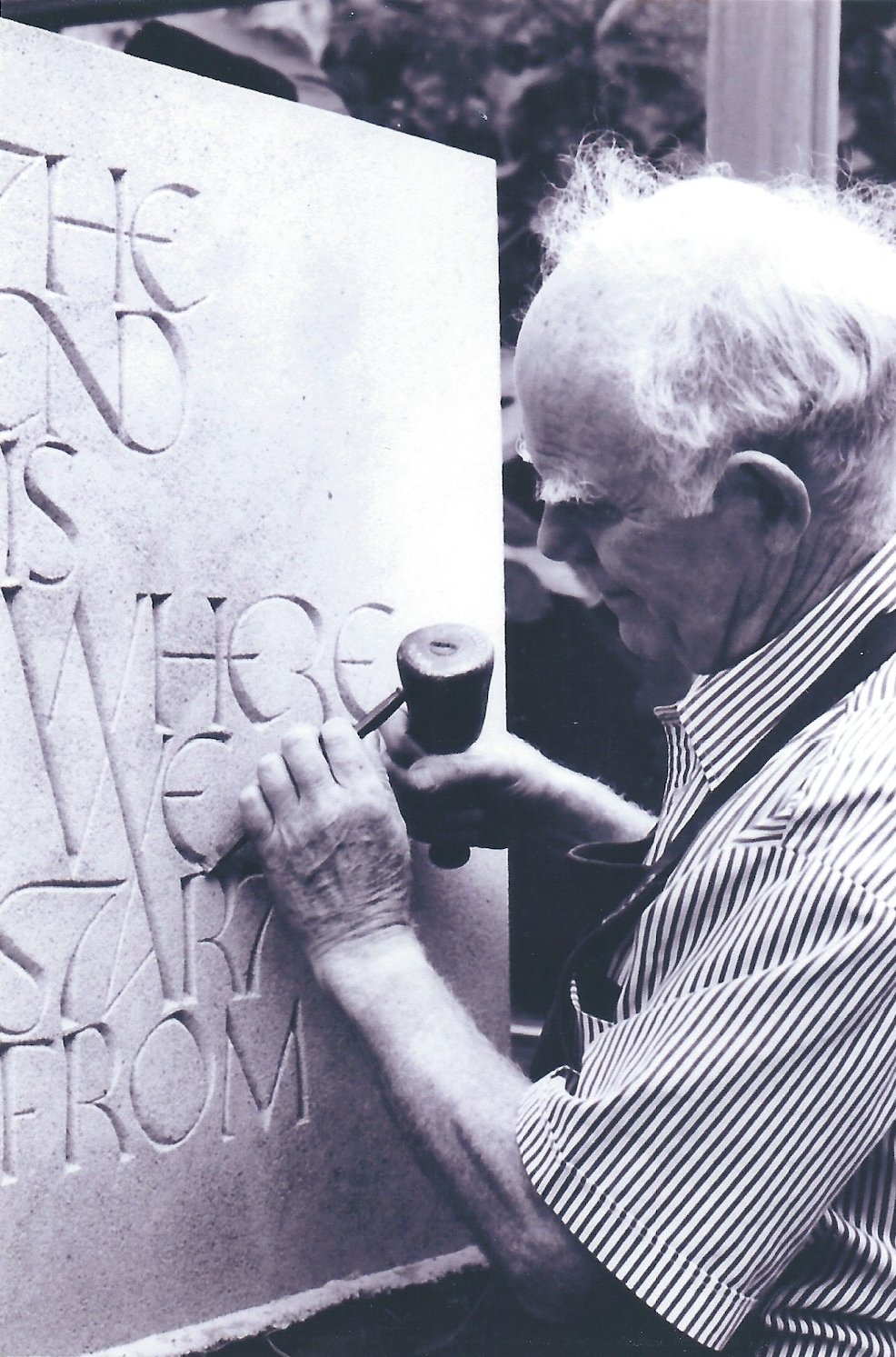
- Born: Bryant Olcher Fedden; 17 July 1930
- Died: 19 March 2004 (aged 73)
- Occupations: Letter-cutter; glass engraver; sculptor
- Years active: 1954–2004
- Spouse: Kate Fedden (m. 1955)
- Children: 3

Bryant Olcher Fedden (17 July 1930 – 19 March 2004) was a self-taught letter-cutter, glass engraver and sculptor who developed his craft in a workshop environment with craftspeople whom he taught and supported. He was a member of the Gloucestershire Guild of Craftsmen for more than forty years. He was a founder member of the Letter Exchange, a professional organisation promoting lettering in all its forms. Bryant Fedden has work in the Victoria and Albert Museum Collections.

Bryant Fedden went to Bryanston School and followed that with two years in National Service. He then went up to Clare College, Cambridge University where he read history. Bryant married Kate in 1955 and they then taught English in Pakistan. Fedden then taught history at Gordenstoun School in Scotland. They then made the decision to change careers and set up a letter cutting and sculpture workshop in Toddington, Gloucestershire. The workshop gained commissions including a memorial plaque for the Waller era architects for Gloucester Cathedral in 1961.

In 1966, Fedden moved his workshop to Winchcombe, Gloucestershire in part to be closer to Winchcombe Pottery and its manager, the potter Ray Finch. The number of people working at the workshop increased and included Kate Fedden who took on some of the commissioned glass engraving. Notable works by Bryant Fedden at this time included the gates and railings for Tewksbury Abbey, with Keith Jameson, in 1968; the Ivor Gurney Memorial Plaque in Gloucester Cathedral in 1976 and the memorial plaque to Sylvanus Lysons in Gloucester Cathedral in 1989.

Bryant Fedden later moved to Littledean in the Forest of Dean, Gloucestershire where he established a multifunctional workshop together with his wife Kate Fedden (glass engraving), his son Matthew Fedden (artist-blacksmith) and his son-in-law Paul Harper (furniture maker). Fedden's notable works from this time include a viewing platform plaque of a short poem by Robin Munro carved in stained oak for the National Garden Festival in Gateshead in 1990; the carved grave stone for his friend Li Yuan-Chia, the renowned Chinese artist, poet and curator in 1994 and the public art Memorial to Littledean Dairymen in Littledean, Gloucestershire in 2000.

In 2002, Gloucester Cathedral hosted an exhibition of works from Bryant Fedden's various workshops entitled "40 Years of Bryant Fedden Workshops: A Celebration".

== Education ==
Bryant Fedden attended Bryanston School from 1944 to 1948 where he was taught by the sculptor and potter Donald Potter. In Fiona MacCarthy's The Guardian obituary for Potter, she included a description of Potter's experiments in earthenware:

"[Potter] had constructed the wood-fired kiln for earthenware himself, and there are many memories among ex-pupils of staying up for all-night firings, drinking beer and cider while Potter reminisced and quoted William Blake. Those pupils included the distinguished potters Richard Batterham and Mike Dodd, the artist Richard Bawden, the sculptor and lettercutter Bryant Fedden and the architects Richard Burton and Quinlan Terry."

From 1950 Fedden read history and English at Clare College, Cambridge University.

== National Service ==
Bryant Fedden took part in National Service in Nigeria from 1948 to 1950 achieving the rank of 2nd Lieutenant on 24 September 1949.

== Teaching experience ==
Bryant Fedden married his wife Kate in March 1955. He and Kate then moved to Pakistan to teach English from 1955 to 1958.

He taught history at Gordenstoun School from 1958 to 1961.

In 1976, Fedden was invited to teach glass engraving for a year at Morely College, London.

== Early works ==
Bryant Fedden created work from his first year at Bryanston School. Lesley Greene describes Bryant Fedden's "Carved Bison", made at age 14, in her forward to the "40 Years of Bryant Fedden Workshops: A Celebration" exhibition catalogue: "the spirit of the 'bison-ness' of the creature is wonderful."

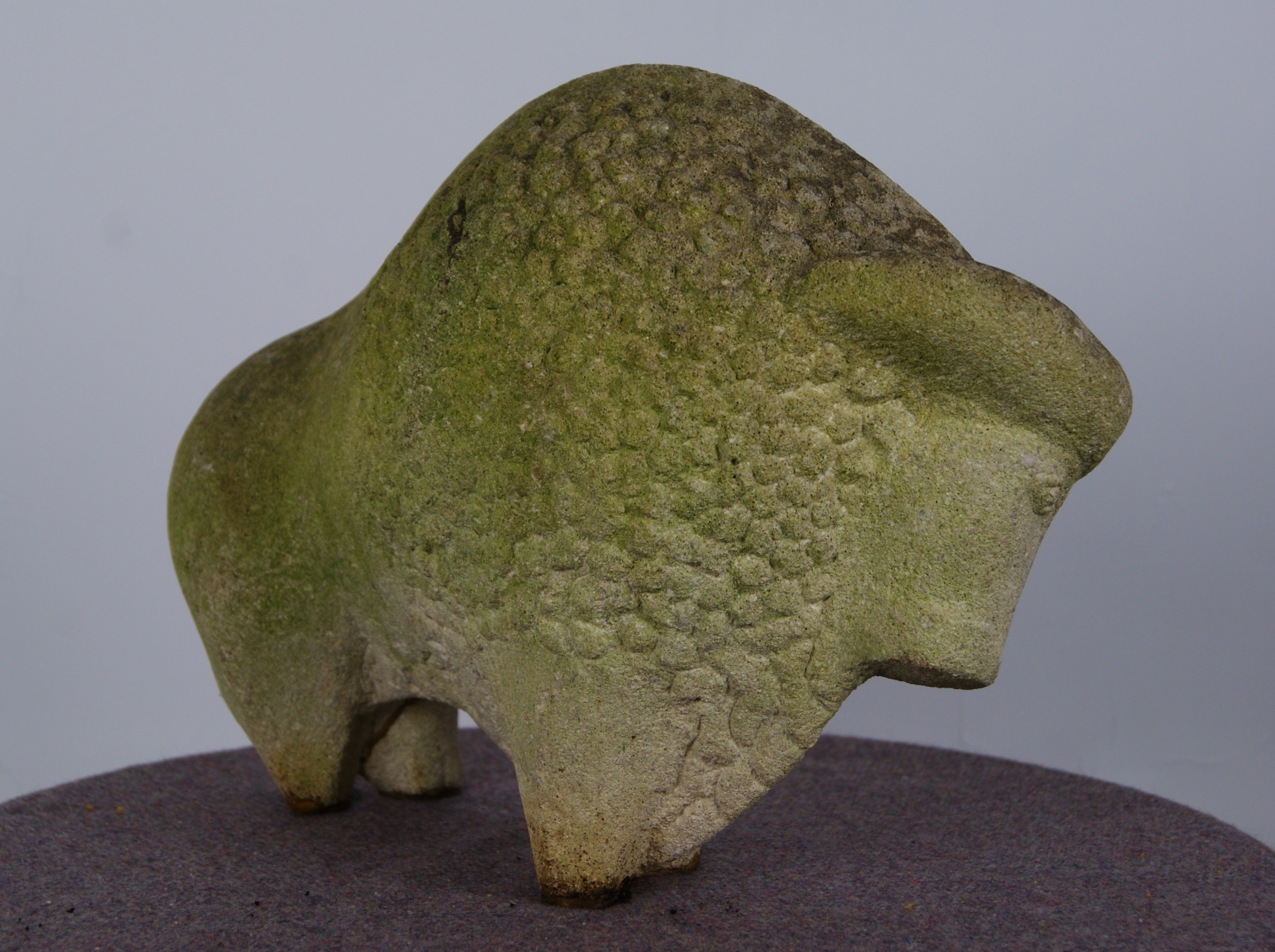
A Bison Carved by Bryant Fedden in 1944, aged fourteen.

Notable Early Works
| Year | Location | Description | Medium | Inscription | Maker/s |
|---|---|---|---|---|---|
| 1944 | Private collection | Carved Bison | Stone carved | n/a | Bryant Fedden |
| 1954 | St. Peter's Church, East Bridgford | Memorial stone for unknown Saxon who first preached on the site of the Church | Stone carved | In honour of the unknown who first preached Christ where now stands this church, the most ancient yet proven in this diocese. | Bryant Fedden |

== The Bryant Fedden Workshops ==
The following is an introduction to the various workshops that Bryant Fedden set up during his working life.

=== Toddington Workshop 1961–1966 ===
Bryant Fedden set up his first workshop in a house in Toddington, Gloucestershire.

==== Workshop member ====
Bryant Fedden

Notable Works - Toddington
| Year | Location | Description | Medium | Inscription | Maker/s |
|---|---|---|---|---|---|
| 1961 | Gloucester Cathedral | Memorial Plaque for The Waller Era as Cathedral Architects 1847 - 1960 | Slate carving | "From 1847 - 1960 the fabric of this Cathedral Church received the skilled and devoted care of three members of one family of architects Frederick Sandham Waller Frederick William Waller Noel Huxley Waller whose son Major Anthony Durrant Waller was killed at Dunkirk / May 29th. 1940" | Bryant Fedden |
| 1961 | St. Michael's Church, Winson, near Cirencester | Memorial to Walter Williams Field and Elizabeth Field | Slate carving | "In memory of WALTER WILLIAMS FIELD for fifty years carpenter and wheelwright in the parish and devoted servant of this Church who died 4 i 1961 aged 79 & ELIZABETH his wife who was postmistress for thirty-five years who died 6 ii 1951 aged 70" | Bryant Fedden |
| 1961-2 | Winchcombe | "Isbourne Private Press" name plate | Slate carving | "Isbourne Private Press" | Bryant Fedden |

==== Publications ====
On 11 October 1966 the Birmingham Daily Post carried an article entitled "Display of craftsmanship" which featured an exhibition at the Department of Architecture and Planning Hall in Coventry. "Bryant Fedden of Toddington near Cheltenham" together with John Makepeace, Ann Sutton and others had been invited to take part by the Crafts Council of Great Britain and Coventry Corporation. An unnamed representative of the Crafts Council was quoted in the article: "Care was taken...to include only exhibits that demonstrated the relevance and value of craft techniques in an industrial society."

=== Tan Yard Bank Workshop – Winchcombe 1966 to 1990 ===
In 1966 Bryant Fedden set up his second workshop at Tan Yard Bank in Winchcombe, Gloucestershire.

==== Workshop members ====
Bryant Fedden, Kate Fedden, Keith Jameson, Steve Marchant

==== The Bryant Fedden Slate ====
In the summer of 1969, David Palmer, a counsellor at UCLA and his family were touring the Cotswolds in England when they were directed to Bryant Fedden's Tan Yard Bank workshop by an owner of one of his name plate works. David Palmer was given a tour of the workshop by Bryant Fedden. It was during this tour that David Palmer saw an alphabet slate and in his words "I fell in love with it". David Palmer could not afford to buy it but Bryant Fedden said that he could take it and perhaps find a buyer for it. David Palmer placed the slate in his touring van and then carried it onto the plane back to the USA. On arrival the slate was initially put on display at the UCLA Student Bookstore and then, after a period in storage, was moved to the School of Library Service at UCLA in the Powell Library basement. It was on display in the Horn Press Chappel a group developed to utilise letter presses as part of a "Typography and the Graphic Arts" course developed by Professor Andrew H. Horn. David Palmer published a small pamphlet cataloguing the journey of the slate from Winchcombe to UCLA entitled "The Bryant Fedden Slate: : Its Journey from Gloucestershire to the UCLA Library School" and used the Horn Press facilities to print it. In 1992 the School of Library Service now named Graduate School of Library and Information Science moved to a new smaller building and the Horn Press Chappel was disbanded and the slate was moved to the Graduate School of Library and Information Science. In 1994 the Graduate School of Library and Information Science was incorporated into the UCLA Graduate School of Education and Information Studies (GSEIS).

Notable Works - Tan Yard Bank
| Year | Location | Description | Medium | Inscription | Maker/s |
|---|---|---|---|---|---|
| 1967 | Unknown | Engraved plate glass door | Glass engraving | Abstract design | Bryant Fedden |
| 1968 | Tewkesbury Abbey | Gates and railings | Metalwork | n/a | Bryant Fedden and Keith Jameson |
| 1969 | UCLA Student Union Book shop then Powell Library Horn Press Chappel then to UCLA Graduate School of Education and Information Studies Lab and Library. | Alphabet Sample | Slate carving | One Side: " A B C " Other Side: "a b c d e f g h i j k l m n o p q r s t u v w x y z 1 2 3 4 5 A B C D E F G H I J K L M N O P Q R S T U V W X Y Z &" | Bryant Fedden |
| 1970 | Jesus Chapel, Manchester Cathedral | Large metal cross framework with tapestry between the frame | Metalwork and textiles | n/a | Gerald Carter, Bryant Fedden, Keith Jameson and Theo Moorman |
| 1970 | Unknown | Engraved Dartington Glass plate | Glass engraving | "A B C D E F G H I J K L M N O P Q R S T U V W X Y Z" | Bryant Fedden |
| 1974 | Fish Hill near Broadway, Gloucestershire | Topograph Memorial commissioned by Sir Gordon Russell in memory of his brother Donald Russell | Carved and engraved Welsh grey slate with an engraved stone base | "THIS PICNIC AREA WAS LAID OUT BY THE WORCESTERSHIRE COUNTY COUNCIL IN MEMORY OF DONALD GEORGE SHELFORD RUSSELL OBE 1894 - 1970 OF BROADWAY A MEMBER OF THE COUNCIL 1936 - 1969 ALDERMAN 1952 - 1970 AND CHAIRMAN OF THE PLANNING COMMITTEE 1952 - 1965 * * * AND IN RECOGNITION OF HIS CONSTANT CARE FOR THE AMENITIES OF THE COUNTY * * * IT WAS OPENED BY HUGH M WATSON MTPI MICL MIMunE County Planning Officer 1946 - 1972 ON 30th MARCH 1974" | Bryant Fedden and Keith Jameson |
| 1975 | Atlantic College, St. Donats | Memorial plaque to Kurt Hahn | Slate carving | "KURT HAHN 1886 1974 His vision & energy were decisive in founding SALEM 1920 * GORDONSTOUN 1933 * OUTWARD BOUND 1941 * DUKE of EDINBURGH AWARD SCHEME 1956 * TREVELYAN SCHOLARSHIPS 1958 * MEDICAL COMMISSION FOR ACCIDENT PREVENTION 1964 * ATLANTIC COLLEGE 1962 * Two passions are not likely to die out in this world, love of country and love of liberty. They can be kept pure by one ideal which can tame but not cannot weaken them ~ tender love for all mankind." | Bryant Fedden |
| 1975 | St.Mary's Church, Great Witcombe, Gloucestershire | Memorial plaque to William Whitehead Hicks Beach | Slate carving | "In loving memory of WILLIAM WHITEHEAD HICKS BEACH of Witcombe Park Eldest son of Ellis Hicks Beach BORN 23RD MARCH 1907 DIED 1ST JANUARY 1975 He was a soldier lawyer sportsman and Member of Parliament for Cheltenham for 14 years ~ and his life was spent in service to his country and fellow men" | Bryant Fedden |
| 1976 | Southwell Minster | Plaque commemorating Frank Russell Barry | Slate carving | "FRANK RUSSELL BARRY DSO DD 1890-1976 Scholar Pastor Prophet Fellow & Chaplain of Oriel College Army Chaplain Principal Knutsford Ordination School Professor King's College London Vicar of the University Church Oxford & Fellow of Balliol College Canon & Sub Dean Westminster Abbey & Rector of St John's Smith Square BISHOP OF SOUTHWELL 1941 – 1963 The Lord giveth wisdom, from his mouth cometh knowledge & understanding" | Design: Bryant Fedden; Carving: Simon Verity |
| 1976 | Gloucester Cathedral | Ivor Gurney Memorial Plaque | Stone carving | "Ivor Gurney 1890 - 1937. composer and poet chorister of this Cathedral Church. Do not forget me quite O Severn meadows" | Bryant Fedden |
| 1979 | Christ Church, Cheltenham | Glass Hanging Cross | Glass sculpture and glass engraving | n/a | Bryant Fedden |
| 1980 | Gloucester Cathedral | Tablet for Frederick William Harvey | Slate carving | Frederick William HARVEY D.C.M. Soldier and Poet of Gloucestershire 1888 - 1957 "He loved the vision of this world and found it good" | Bryant Fedden |
| 1980 | Chapter house, Bristol Cathedral | Three large arched windows with glass engravings | Glass engraving | Extensive quotations | Bryant Fedden |
| 1981 | St. George's Church, Tuffley | Last Supper Sculpture Reredos | Stone carving and slate | n/a | Bryant Fedden |
| 1985 | Gloucester Cathedral | Memorial plaque to Bernard Ashwell, Cathedral Architect | Slate carving | The fabric of this Cathedral Church was in the skilled & devoted care of BERNARD ASHWELL M.C., F.R.I.B.A. from 1960 | |
| 1984 | Miserden Church | Memorial to Margery Hamilton Sinclair | Orton Scar Stone carving | "In happy memory of MARGEY HAMILTON SINCLAIR 1892 - 1980 who loved Misarden and this Church for 68 years" | Bryant Fedden |
| 1986 | Churchdown Comprehensive School | Memorial to two boys | Glass engraving | "Two lads thought there was no more behind But such a day tomorrow as today And to be boy eternal DAVID WATSON aged 11 RICHARD WATSON aged 13 . killed on Christmas Day 1984" | Bryant Fedden |
| 1987 | Private Collection | Two carved inter-connecting sculptures "U" and "N" | Carving in Portland Stone | n/a | Bryant Fedden |
| 1989 | The Wilson Gallery, Cheltenham | Plaque commemorating the opening of an extension to the gallery | Wood carving on stained ash | "This extension to the ART GALLERY was opened by HRH the PRINCESS ROYAL on 18 ix 1989" [Includes a roundel motif from the clergy seat of 1914 by Ernest Gimson and Robert Weir Schultz for Westminster cathedral, which is used as the museum's logo.] | Bryant Fedden |
| 1989 | Gloucester Cathedral | Memorial to Sylvanus Lysons | Slate carving | "This Chapel was reordered to mark the nine hundredth anniversary of this Cathedral Church & in memory of Sylvanus Lysons 1665-1731 Benefactor in the parish of Hempsted & in the Diocese of Gloucester DEO GRATIS 1989" | Bryant Fedden |
| 1989 | St. Mary de Crypt | Memorial to Reverend George Whitefield (1714 -1770) | Carved slate | "GEORGE WHITEFIELD 1714-1770 'Prince of Preachers' pioneer in evangelism child care & education in Britain and America, colleague of Charles & John Wesley, attended The Crypt School and in this church began his preaching ministry 27th June 1736" | Bryant Fedden |

==== Tan Yard Bank Gallery ====
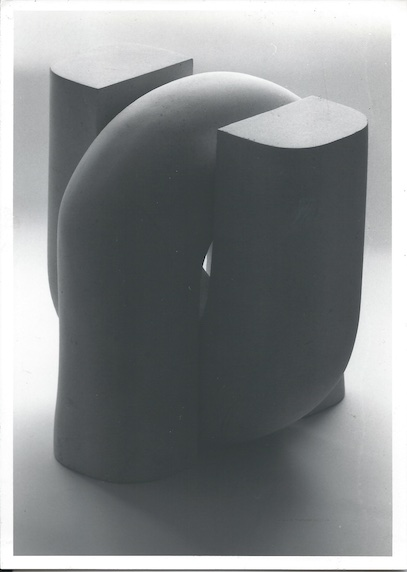
A portland stone carving of a U and a N by Bryant Fedden

==== Publications ====
A photograph of an engraved glass decanter by Bryant Fedden featured in an article entitled "If your route is around the Cotswolds...a chance to look in on the rural craftsmen" in The Daily Telegraph on 10 August 1972. The article detailed information relating to that year's Guild of Gloucestershire Craftsmen Exhibition at Painswick, Gloucestershire. Note: The Guild changed their name to the Gloucestershire Guild of Craftsmen in 1984.

Bryant Fedden featured in the January 1973 edition of Gloucestershire Life magazine. In the first of a series on Gloucestershire Craftsmanship, the article by N. Large, included the following from Fedden on his ideal:

"My ideal is a craft workshop, embracing individuals with different skills, and so forming a pool of ability that can attempt any commission."

On 15 June 1973, The Guardian ran an article entitled "West Country Craft" detailing an exhibition by the Guild of Gloucestershire Craftsmen at Foyles Art Gallery in London. In her article Hazel Shaw included the following: "...perhaps the highlight of the exhibition is the work of two associates: Bryant Fedden and Keith Jameson. Their work really holds the full flavour of rural Britain. Between them they are capable of working to a high standard in an incredible range of materials." Fedden was interviewed by Shaw and offers both a view of the way he and Keith Jameson were working then and their aspirations too:

"We like challenges, and we don't get enough of them. At the moment we don't feel extended. So often people want to use our workmanship to make replicas of something they saw in Harrods. We want the chance to be craftsmen of 1973...Sometimes people are prepared to pay up to £200 for a carved gravestone. We try to persuade them to erect a piece of sculpture instead, or a bench made of lovely reddish ironstone, or a fountain for the whole community to remember the deceased by."

In 1976 Barrie & Jenkins published Geoffery Beard's International Modern Glass. The book featured two works by Bryant Fedden: an engraved plate glass door with abstract design and a Dartington glass plate engraved with the alphabet.

Marcus Binney and Peter Burman produced a report on the role of churches and cathedrals with regard to the British tourist industry in 1977. Their report included the following:

"The new Roman Catholic cathedrals of Liverpool and Clifton (Bristol) have attracted attention and many visitors, and in both cases the furnishing and decoration of the building has been made the occasion for commissioning major works of art from artists of the calibre of Elizabeth Frink, Patrick Reyntiens, Simon Verity and Bryant Fedden. This is a trend and a welcome one."

The Bryant Fedden Slate: Its Journey from Gloucestershire to the UCLA Library School was written by David Palmer with photography by Robert D. Hayes and first published in 1977.

In the accompanying catalogue for the "Festival '80" exhibition of The Guild of Glass Engravers there was a direct quote from Bryant Fedden describing his practice:

"I engrave glass with a flexible drive and being a sculptor and letter cutter have found great satisfaction in using glass as a medium for engraving lettering and abstract designs."

In 1980 John Lancaster published a book on lettering entitled Lettering Techniques which featured the work of Bryant Fedden at the time of the Tan Yard Bank Workshop. In the book Lancaster used Bryant Fedden's work as an exemplar regarding "incised lettering". He described Fedden as follows:

"[H]e has developed, through personal experience and trial and error an individual approach to this important aspect of the visual arts that exudes a deeply felt sensitivity to pattern and form and a seemingly natural ability to combine these as a total visual experience with his selected materials."

Also in 1980 Who's Who in Art included Bryant Fedden as a "...glass engraver and letter cutter in glass, stone and wood."

Isabelle Anscombe's article in The Times, 16 May 1981, entitled "Collecting: Letters mean so much" covered "The Art of the Scribe" Exhibition by The Society of Scribes and Illuminators. In the article she included the following quote regarding Bryant Fedden's practice:

"In stone and glass Bryant Fedden uses the incursion of the hard edge of letters in a three-dimensional manner very different from the graphic effects gained by David Kindersley or, more decoratively, by Simon Verity. His large, wide cut letters score the surface, diving into the stone rather than remaining on the surface. He even produces three-dimensional stone letters, comfortably hand-sized; a curled up "e" proved to be primordially satisfying to hold."

In 1986 The Well Furnished Garden by Michael Balston was published by Simon & Schuster. The book featured Bryant Fedden's "set of three seats in Horton stone and a low table in Horton stone" created in the Tan Yard Bank workshop.

Also in 1986 the Taplinger Publishing Company, New York published Contemporary Calligraphy: Modern Scribes and Lettering Artists II edited by Peter Halliday. Bryant Fedden's glass goblet with monograph, created with flexible drive engraving, featured in the book.

"The Spirit of the Letter" exhibition at Portsmouth City Museum and Art Gallery 1989 was accompanied by an exhibition brochure that included short profiles on each of the participants of the group of exhibitors. Bryant Fedden's profile included the following:

"Bryant Fedden was born in 1930 and brought up in Devon. He read history at Cambridge, then worked in stonemasons' yards and in advertising agencies before going on to teach in Pakistan and Scotland. [He] ...set up his present lettering workshop in Winchcombe, Gloucestershire, with Kate Fedden, his wife. They cut and colour inscriptions in stone and in wood, and engrave window glass and presentation glass. Commissions can be seen in the cathedrals of Blackburn, Bristol, Gloucester, Manchester and Southwell, in Birmingham Repertory Theatre, the Royal Chelsea Hospital, and in various colleges of Oxford University."

In March 2013, Dr. Paul Harper submitted a PhD thesis at London Metropolitan University entitled Doing and Talking: The Value of Video Interviewing for Researching and Theorising Craft. Harper's "Biographical Preface" included the following about his experiences of Bryant Fedden during his time at the Tan Yard Bank Workshop:

"My first encounter with craft was through my father-in-law, the stone carver and letter cutter, Bryant Fedden. Bryant's work demonstrated very fine workmanship. His letterforms were exact and precisely executed, but they also had a lightness, or "bounce" as he called it, that contributed to a lovely sense of balance and harmony. This was partly achieved by carving directly, with minimal drawing out, so that the letters were realised from the start as carved 3-dimensional forms. He exemplified a certain notion of craft as skilful making but what attracted me most about the model of craft that he represented to me was its holistic nature. The standard that he aspired to in his carving reflected an aspiration towards integrity in the rest of his life. His workshop was close to the house, and was the focal point for a network of relationships: familial, social, and business. Bryant's practice was at the centre of a lifestyle that was socially and politically engaged, in which work and home, aesthetics and politics, a reflective interior life, and an outward-looking sense of community were part of a whole."

=== Dean Croft Workshop - Littledean - 1990 to 2004 ===
In 1990 Bryant Fedden set up his third and final workshop at Dean Croft, Littledean, Forest of Dean, Gloucestershire.

==== Workshop members ====
Bryant Fedden, Matt Baker, Li Yuan-Chia, Kate Fedden, Matthew Fedden, Paul Harper.

Notable Works - Dean Croft
| Year | Location | Description | Medium | Inscription | Maker/s |
|---|---|---|---|---|---|
| 1990 | National Garden Festival, Gateshead | Welcome plaque | Stone carving | "Welcome to the National Garden Festival Gateshead" | Bryant Fedden |
| 1990 | Holy Trinity, Amberley | Grave stone for Jonathan Buckley | Stone carving | "Son Brother Husband Father Friend" | Bryant Fedden |
| 1992 | Tewkesbury Abbey | Altar | Carved wood | "I am that I am" | Bryant Fedden and Paul Harper |
| 1992 | Eastington Church | Tower Screen | Glass engraving | "THEN HE SHOWED ME THE WATER OF THE RIVER OF LIFE SPARKLING LIKE CRYSTAL" and c. | Bryant Fedden |
| 1994 | Lanercost Priory, Cumbria | Grave stone for Li Yuan-Chia | Carved red sandstone | "Time-Life-Space" "李元嘉 [Li Yuan-Chia] LI YUAN CHIA 1929 - 1994 Artist" | Bryant Fedden |
| 1995 | Gloucester Cathedral | Memorial tablet for Jean Yates | Stone carving | JEAN YATES 1931 1995 A SERVANT OF GOD A FRIEND TO ALL Her ashes are interred in this Chantry Chapel | Bryant Fedden |
| 1995 | Walsall Railway Station | 1.Nonsense poem fragments on wall plaques. 2.Waiting room glass panels 3.Seating 4.Metal screen | 1.Carved wood 2.Engraved glass 3.Metalwork/Wood 4.Metalwork | 1."If you were A vulgar fraction Love e I were a perfect Square We'd go For a quiet Subtraction Love In the Dirty Moonlight Air We'd go Where/The 3 [symbol here] Cube Roots Go77 To the Land of the Surd and the Log Where We'd dance by The Light of the Decimal/ Do9 While the Railway quietly recurs." 2."Look out" | Bryant Fedden, Matthew Fedden and Paul Harper |
| 1998 | Upper Poppleton, near York | Memorial to Austin Wright, sculptor | Carved slate | "AUSTIN WRIGHT 1911-1997 SCULPTOR" | Bryant Fedden |
| 1998 | Hunstanton | Public bench and table | Carved English oak and steel | "Waves Wash & Sun's Glaze" | Bryant Fedden, Matthew Fedden and Paul Harper |
| 1999 | Chipping Camden Library | Inspirational plaque | Carving on Hornton and Cotswold stone | "I must go back to the start & to the source - Risk & relish trust my language too - WHAT WE CALL THE BEGINNING IS OFTEN THE END - AND TO MAKE AN END IS TO MAKE A BEGINNING - THE END IS WHERE WE START FROM" | Bryant Fedden |
| 2000 | Western Access to Littledean | Memorial to Littledean Dairymen | Metal and carved slate | "LITTLEDEAN (in gold) Dedicated to all the dairymen who once farmed in this parish." | Bryant Fedden |
| 2002 | Huntingdon | Memorial to the first charter of Huntingdon | Brick, York stone and stainless steel | "HUNTEDON - FIRST CHARTER GRANTED BY KING JOHN - AD 1205" | Bryant Fedden |
| 2002 | All Saints, Huntingdon | Public benches | Portland stone and steel | Letters of the alphabet | Bryant Fedden and Matthew Fedden |

==== Dean Croft Workshop Gallery ====
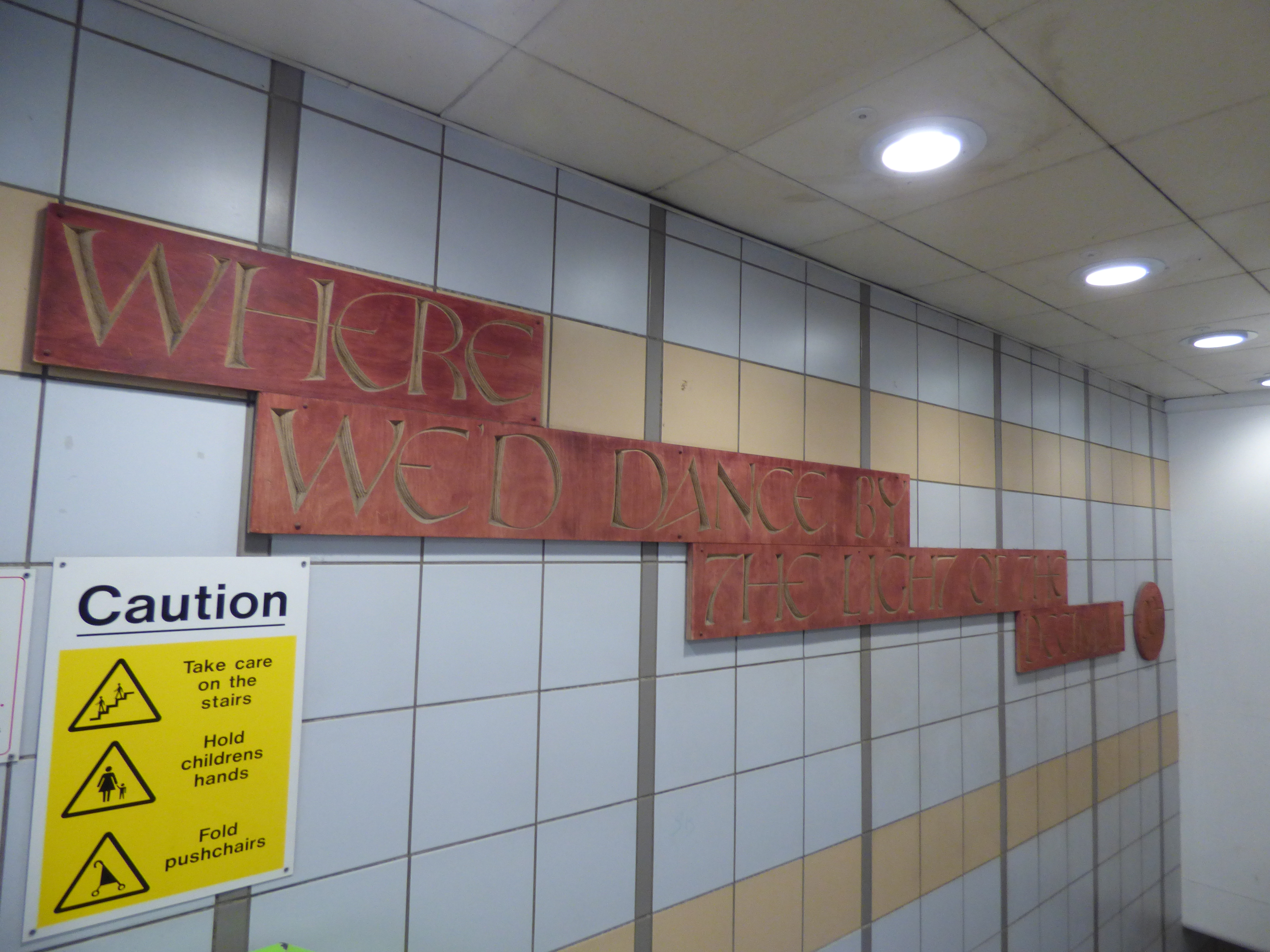
Walsall Station - sign - Where We'd dance by the Light of the Decimal Do9 (25827249107)

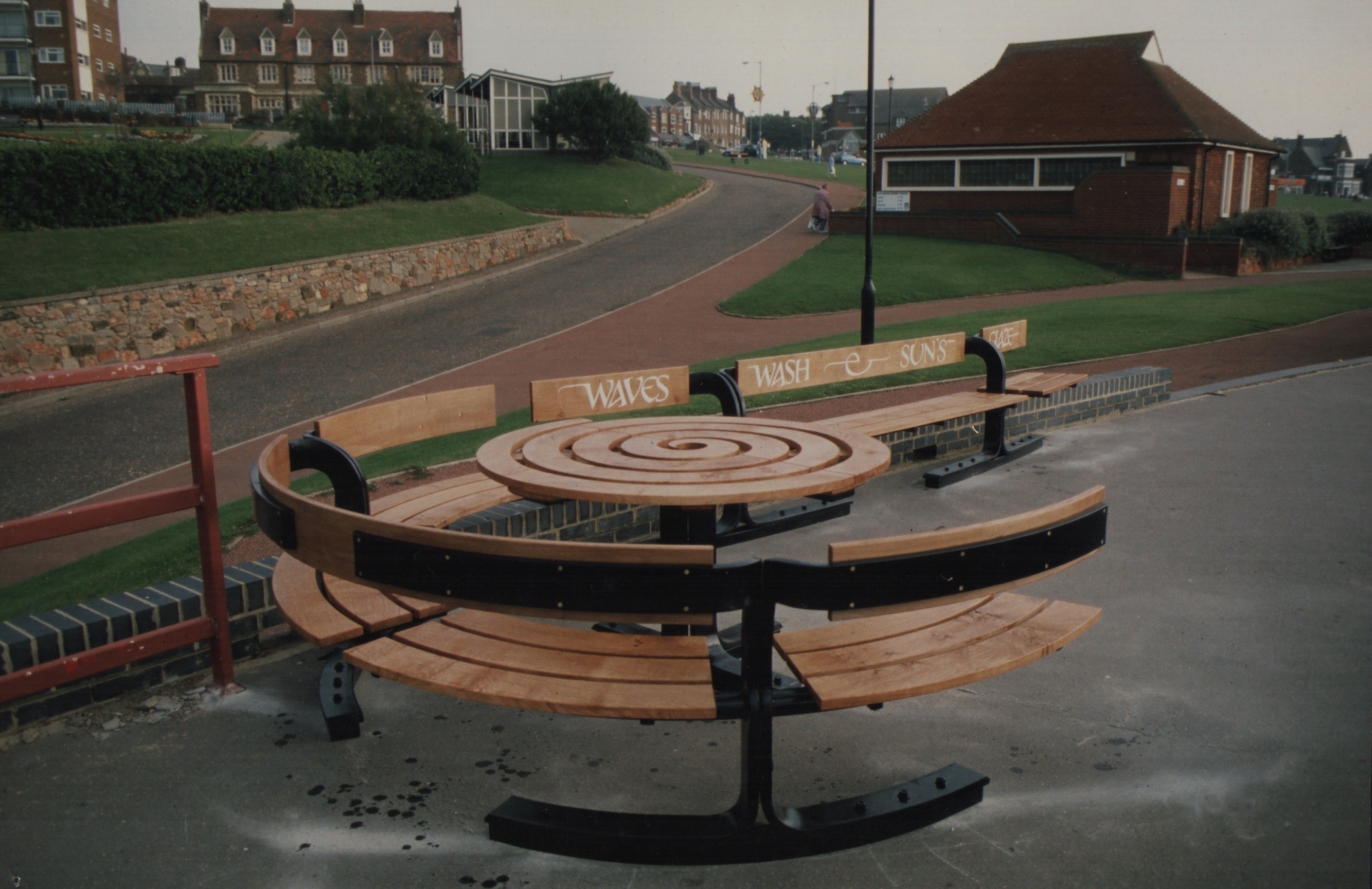
A public bench and table on Hunstanton seafront by Bryant Fedden, Matthew Fedden and Paul Harper

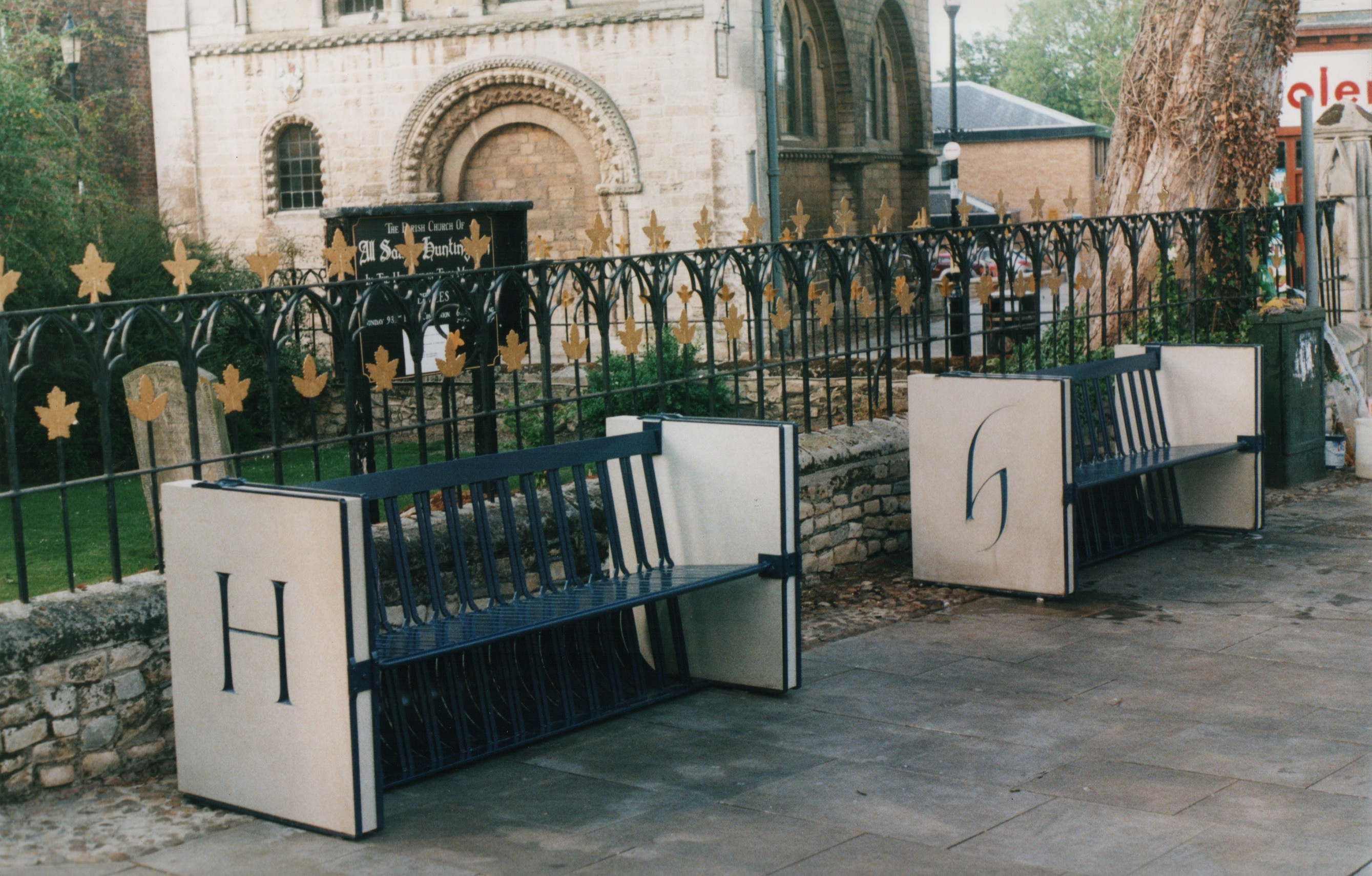
All Saints Church, Huntingdon Benches in Portland stone and steel by Bryant Fedden and Matthew Fedden

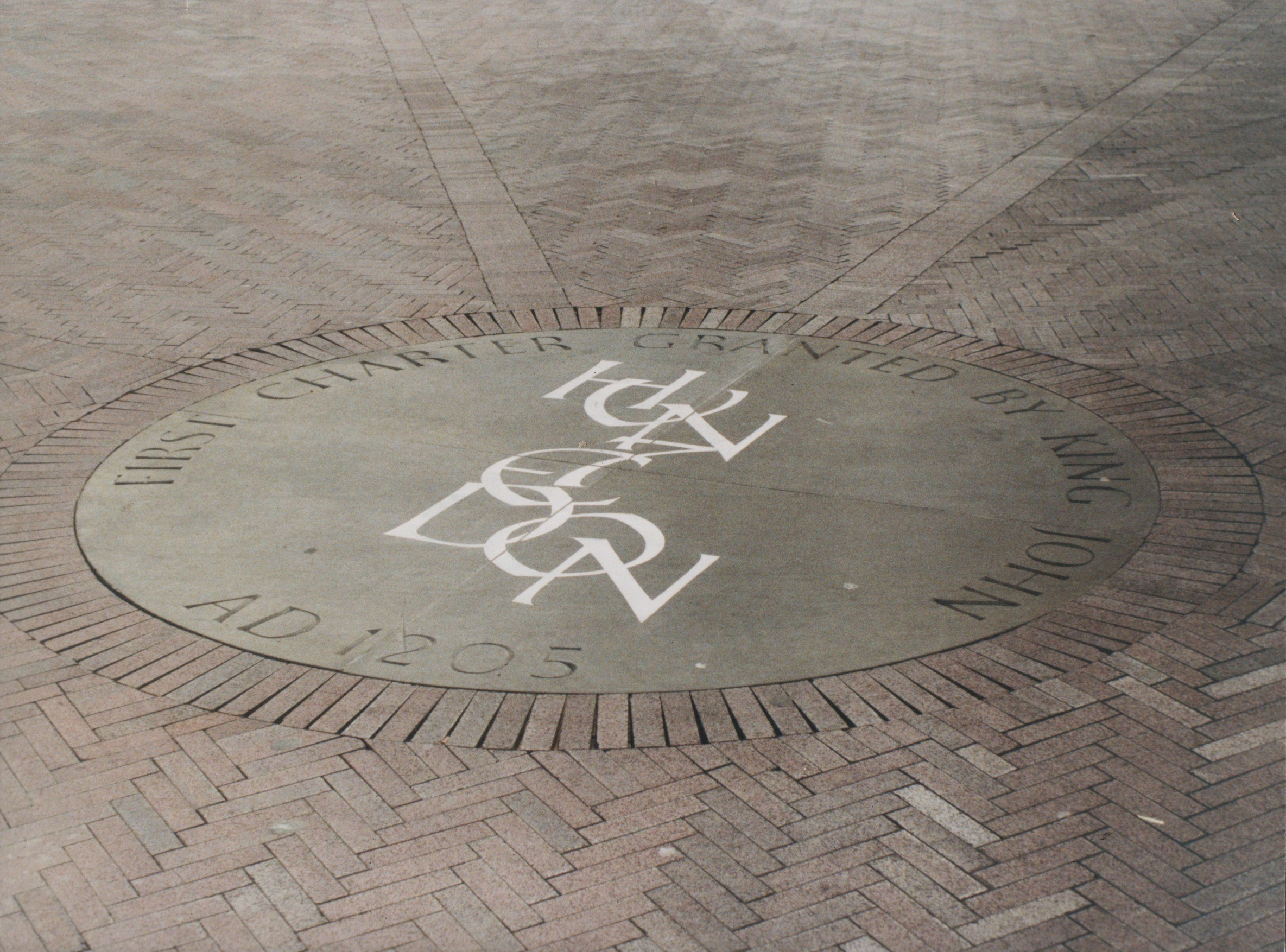
Huntingdon memorial to the first charter in brick, carved York stone and steel by Bryant Fedden

==== Publications & Media ====
In 1991 Bryant Fedden appeared on the HTV programme Makers. These were short television programmes featuring a range of crafts people. Bryant Fedden was interviewed in his Littledean workshop by Jan Leeming. The programme included the following exchange:

Location: The stone and slate cross in the form of figures at The Last Supper, St George's church, Tuffley, Gloucester.

Jan Leeming: People usually decide they will work in stone or they will work in glass or they will work in wood and you work in all three. Is there any reason why?

Bryant Fedden: Well, all I'm really doing is using lettering in various forms. And I started by deciding that I wanted to make a living at lettering and therefore I used as many aspects of it as I could to make a living but very soon I found that the interest was to develop them in various…sculptural forms. I have always wanted to sculpt and I always have and even now when I cut letters I think of them as sculpture.

Leeming: Your lettering is your main love isn't it?

Fedden: That's right yes. I think of lettering as forms of sculpture. As these figures relate to each other so letters relate to each other in weight and shape and bulk and the space between them. The way that each letter relates to the other is based on those problems.

On 23 July 1994 The Daily Telegraph carried a feature on the Gloucester Guild of Craftsmen Annual Exhibition in Painswick Centre, then known as the Painswick Institute. Paul Barker's article entitled "Antiques of the Future" included the following: "...in the meadow, behind the tithe barn, the letter cutter Bryant Fedden had a delicate stone fountain on display, with "Watershed" carved vertically up the pedestal. A garden seat, handy for any arbour, bore the epigraph "Look Out"." The catalogue for the 10th Anniversary Exhibition for the Letter Exchange in 1998 featured a short profile of Bryant Fedden and the following direct quote he talks of the practice of the Dean Croft Workshop:

"I work in a collection of workshops, furniture-making, blacksmithying, printmaking and letter-cutting. It is a bubble of excitement; ideas and designs, problems and crises are shared and whenever possible the family, for we all are related, work together designing and making objects which we hope are exciting."

The Times newspaper of 13 April 1998 carried an article by Jim McClue that featured the above Letter Exchange exhibition. In it McClue included the following:

"LETTER EXCHANGE - a society of artists working with alphabets - is ten years old. Its celebratory exhibition is full of mastery, yet vibrantly alive. Whether cutting memorials in slate or brushing letters on vellum, these are alpha craftsmen and world betas. Bryant Fedden's Pine Alphabet Box and Pat Chaloner's glass quotations caught my iota, but there is something here for anyone interested in writing, art or design."

Simplicity or Splendour: Arts and Crafts Living: Objects from the Cheltenham Collections (1999), edited by Annette Carruthers and Mary Greensted, features a detailed description of the commemorative plaque produced by Bryant Fedden for the Wilson Gallery, Cheltenham. Bryant Fedden's profile includes the following:

"Bryant Fedden is a...local maker and is also a life member of the Gloucestershire Guild of Craftsmen. He is well known for his lettering on glass and other materials...Fedden is a self-taught letter cutter and sculptor...Now based in Littledean in the Forest of Dean, Gloucestershire, Fedden works mainly to commission from architects, institutions and individuals and does much work for churches and cathedrals."

The Letter Exchange journal Forum carried a profile of Bryant Fedden in the autumn of 2001. Jon Gibbs interviewed Fedden and included the following:

"There is a sense of playfulness in Bryant's lettering. A delight in intertwining and linking letters to create new shapes and juxtapositions: an intense pleasure in arranging letters and words to play on meanings - to make visual the playfulness of such meanings, and to make the reader/viewer think a little deeper than the surface."

In 2007 Crowood Press published The Art of Letter Cutting in Stone by Tom Perkins. Bryant Fedden and the Dean Croft workshop are profiled in the book and Perkins included the following quote:

"In Gloucestershire Bryant Fedden sculptor, letter cutter in stone and wood, and glass engraver, ran a very successful workshop for over forty years, working with a range of other craftspeople, including his wife, Kate, producing an extensive range of commissioned work and inspiring a number of people to work and live as craftsmen. He was one of the first of his generation to work more freely with carved letterforms, sometimes even carving single three-dimensional letters as pieces of sculpture."

In 2009 the Dunfries and Galloway Life Magazine had a feature on Matt Baker entitled "Art Attack". In the article Baker looks back at his experiences of Fedden at the time of the Dean Croft workshop:

"I was introduced to Bryant Fedden, who was a sculptor and letter cutter," he says. "He quite literally saved me. I wasn't going anywhere with anything and I did a traditional apprenticeship under him. He could do amazing things with wood and invented his own alphabet. He taught me to do letter cutting, saying that if I couldn't make a living as a sculptor at least I could always make a living doing gravestones. He was a generous man, and taught me what it was to live the life of an artist."

== Exhibitions ==
The Lane Gallery, Bradford was the location for a joint exhibition from 13 May - 15 June 1965 entitled "Tapestries by Theo Moorman: Letter cutting by Bryant Fedden".

The Society of Designer Craftsmen held an exhibition at the Commonwealth Institute Art Gallery in 4–29 June 1969 entitled "Crafts '69" in which an engraved goblet entitled "Oracle" by Bryant Fedden was included - price £38. This goblet subsequently became part of the Victoria and Albert Museum Collections. Bryant Fedden also exhibited in the Glass Category: a window panel - engraved and applied glass - price £100; Goblet - abstract design - engraved glass - price £18; goblet with quotation from La Fontaine - engraved glass - price £20; Decanter & six sherry glasses - abstract design- engraved glass - price £45 and in the Lettering Category: "Dynamited" - Hornton Stone (3 panels) - price £75. The exhibition was opened by David Pye.

"The Craftsman's Art", an exhibition organised by the Crafts Advisory Committee was held at the Victoria and Albert Museum, London, from 15 March - 13 May 1973. Bryant Fedden submitted two works which were accepted for the exhibition: a wheel engraved plate and a topograph in Welsh grey slate, made for a Worcestershire County Council picnic site and, presented by Sir Gordon Russell in memory of his brother Donald Russell.

As a member of the Gloucestershire Guild of Craftsmen, Bryant Fedden regularly exhibited his own work as well as that of his colleagues, at the annual Gloucestershire Guild of Craftsmen Exhibition at the Painswick Centre, Painswick and at other locations. For example, in June 1973, The Guild held an exhibition at the Foyles Art Gallery, now known as the Gallery at Foyles, in London. This exhibition was designed and mounted by Bryant Fedden.

Bryant Fedden (glass engraving) and Kit Barker (painting) had a joint exhibition at the Oxford Gallery, Oxford in December 1976.

The Society of Designer Craftsmen held an exhibition in the Assembly Rooms, York from 26 July to 6 August 1977. Bryant Fedden exhibited a carved green slate entitled "Adam & Eve" and an engraved glass cylinder inscribed "Oh don't mistreat the fly" and Kate Fedden exhibited a glass cylinder engraved with a Peregrine Falcon and six glass goblets engraved with a Dartford Warbler, a Nuthatch, a Tree Creeper, a Wren, a Crested Tit and a Great Tit respectively.

The "Take a Letter: Craftsmen and Lettering Today" touring exhibition went to London, Bangor and Cardiff during the course of 1979. The exhibition was organised by the British Crafts Centre and the Welsh Crafts Council with support by the Crafts Council. It featured one of the engraved arched windows, by Bryant Fedden, installed in The Chapter House, Bristol Cathedral the following year.

Bryant Fedden contributed to the "Festival Glass '80" exhibition by The Guild of Glass Engravers, which took place at the Church of Saint Lawrence Jewry-by-Guildhall from 7–19 July 1980.

"The Art of the Scribe" exhibition of The Society of Scribes and Illuminators in 1981 featured a carved stone 'e' by Bryant Fedden.

The Guild of Gloucestershire Craftsmen had an exhibition at Schaager Waapen gallery in Alkmaar, Netherlands from May - June 1981. It featured work by Betty Blandino, Bryant Fedden, Kate Fedden, Ray Finch, Rodney Forss, Ann James, Keith Jameson, Mary Noble and Theo Moorman.

Bryant Fedden exhibited examples of his lettering along with Phil Rodgers' ceramics at the National Museum of Wales in January and February 1982.

Kate Fedden exhibited glass engravings at the National Museum of Wales, Cardiff from 1 May - 31 July 1982.

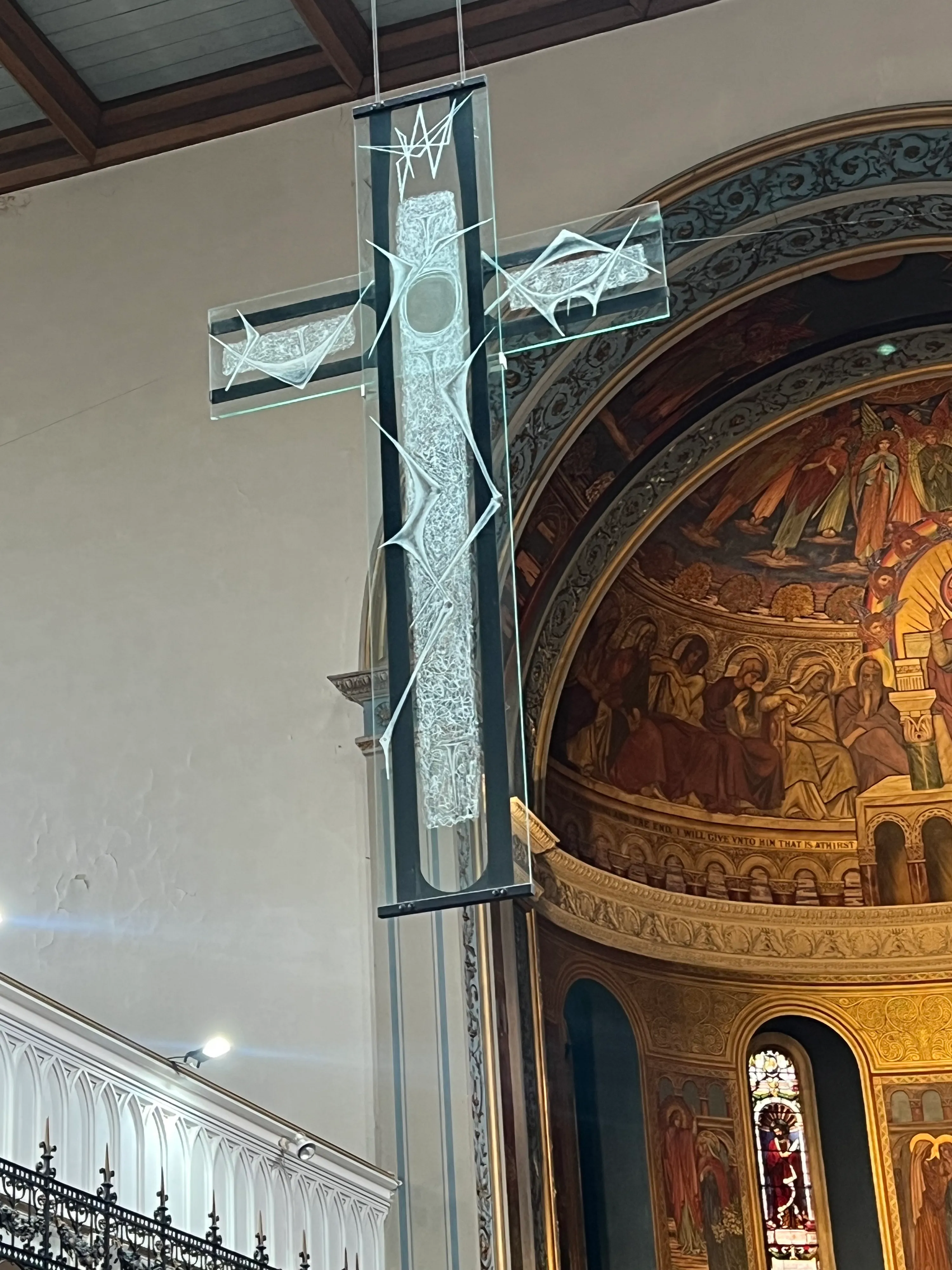
Glass Hanging Cross in Christ Church, Cheltenham, in 2026

The "Prophecy and Vision" exhibition took place across the Arnolfini, Bristol and Camden Arts Centre in 1983. Bryant Fedden exhibited his "Hanging Cross" in Christchurch, Cheltenham. His profile in the accompanying exhibition catalogue included the following:

"I am very interested in the sculptural form of letters and believe that three-dimensional lettering and random lettering are forms that need to be explored much further, both in stone and engraved on glass, especially when used on buildings."

Bryant Fedden's lettering was included in a group exhibition entitled "The Spirit of the Letter: A Celebration of Lettering and Calligraphy in Britain Today" in Portsmouth City Museum & Art Gallery from 12 September - 12 November 1989. Other exhibitors at the exhibition included Michael Harvey, Alec Peever and Stephen Raw.

The Letter Exchange held an exhibition entitled "Letters of the Alphabet" in January and February 1994. Members of the Letter Exchange were asked to supply their take on individual letters. Bryant Fedden exhibited two Portland stone U's interconnected.

"Exhibition of Fine Craft" was the name given to a show at Cyril Wood Court, Bere Regis, Dorset between 19 September and 2 October 1994. The exhibition featured work by Bryant Fedden (Letter Cutter), Kate Fedden (Printmaker), Matt Fedden (Blacksmith), Paul Harper (Furniture Maker) and Tabitha Fedden (Printmaker).

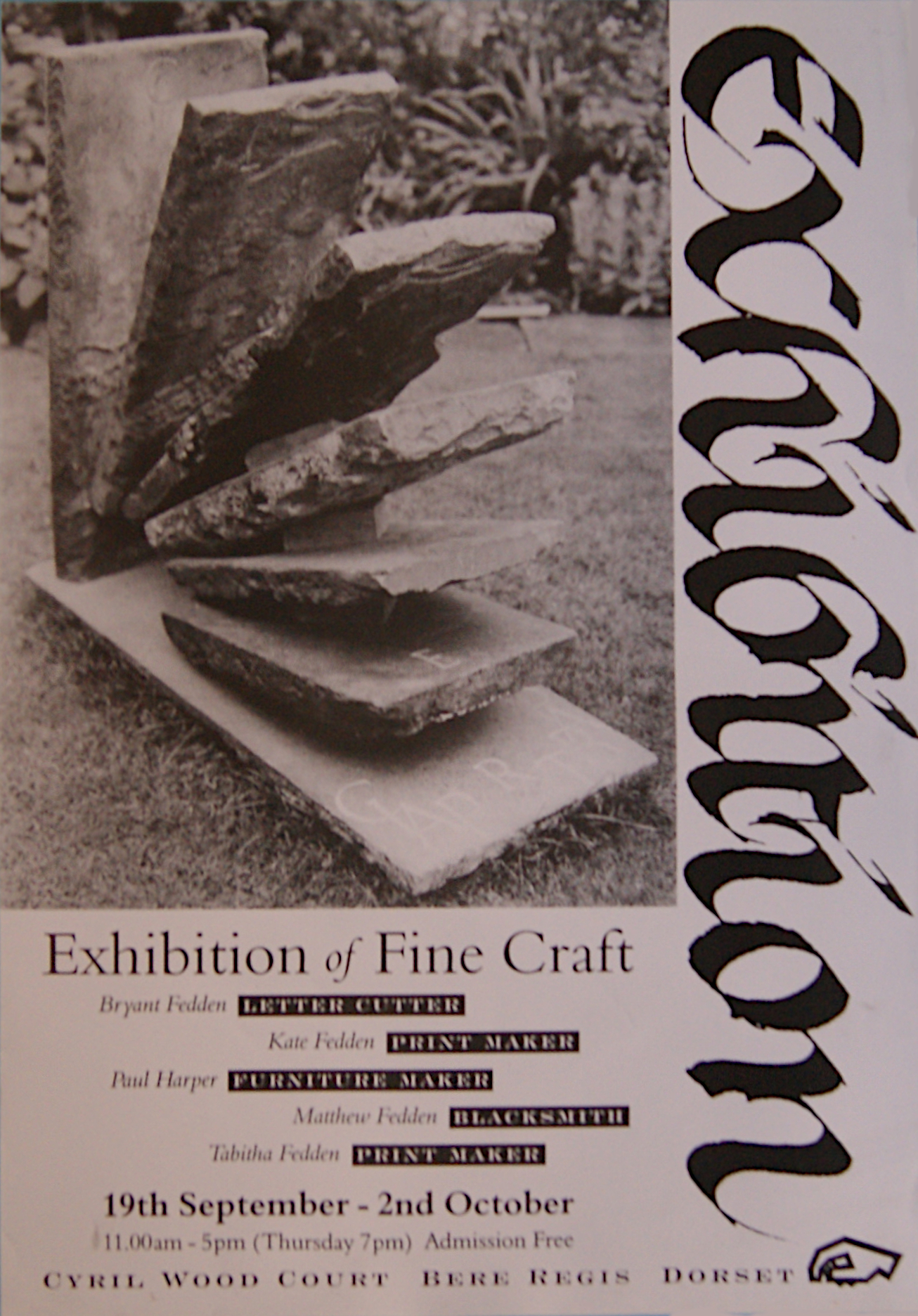
Bryant Fedden Workshop Exhibition Poster, Cyril Wood Court, 19 September - 2 October 1994. Calligraphy by Bryant Fedden

The Letter Exchange held a 10th Anniversary Exhibition at the Morley Gallery, London from 20 April - 14 May 1998. The exhibition featured a stained pine alphabet box by Fedden.

The 40 Years of Bryant Fedden Workshops: A Celebration exhibition was held at Gloucester Cathedral from 6–20 July 2002. The exhibition catalogue had a foreword by Lesley Greene which included the following quote:

"This exhibition is intended to celebrate not only Bryant Fedden's distinguished career as a sculptor and letter-cutter but also the significant role he played in encouraging and shaping the development of other artists and craftspeople though the workshops that he established in Winchcombe and in Littledean. This generosity with his time and his support for others typifies Bryant's approach to his work. Work which has been made in the context of a life well lived, and, beautifully conceived and made as it is, it is not precious. It was not made for the art museum, but rather to be in the world. Bryant's work was largely commissioned, whether for private homes, churches or public spaces, to form the backdrop to people's lives. While this might suggest a proper sense of modesty, there is no false humility about the work which quietly asserts itself through the sureness of the forms and the qualities of craftsmanship. This confident craftsmanship both belies and allows for a certain lightness of touch, and often a playfulness and sense of humour."

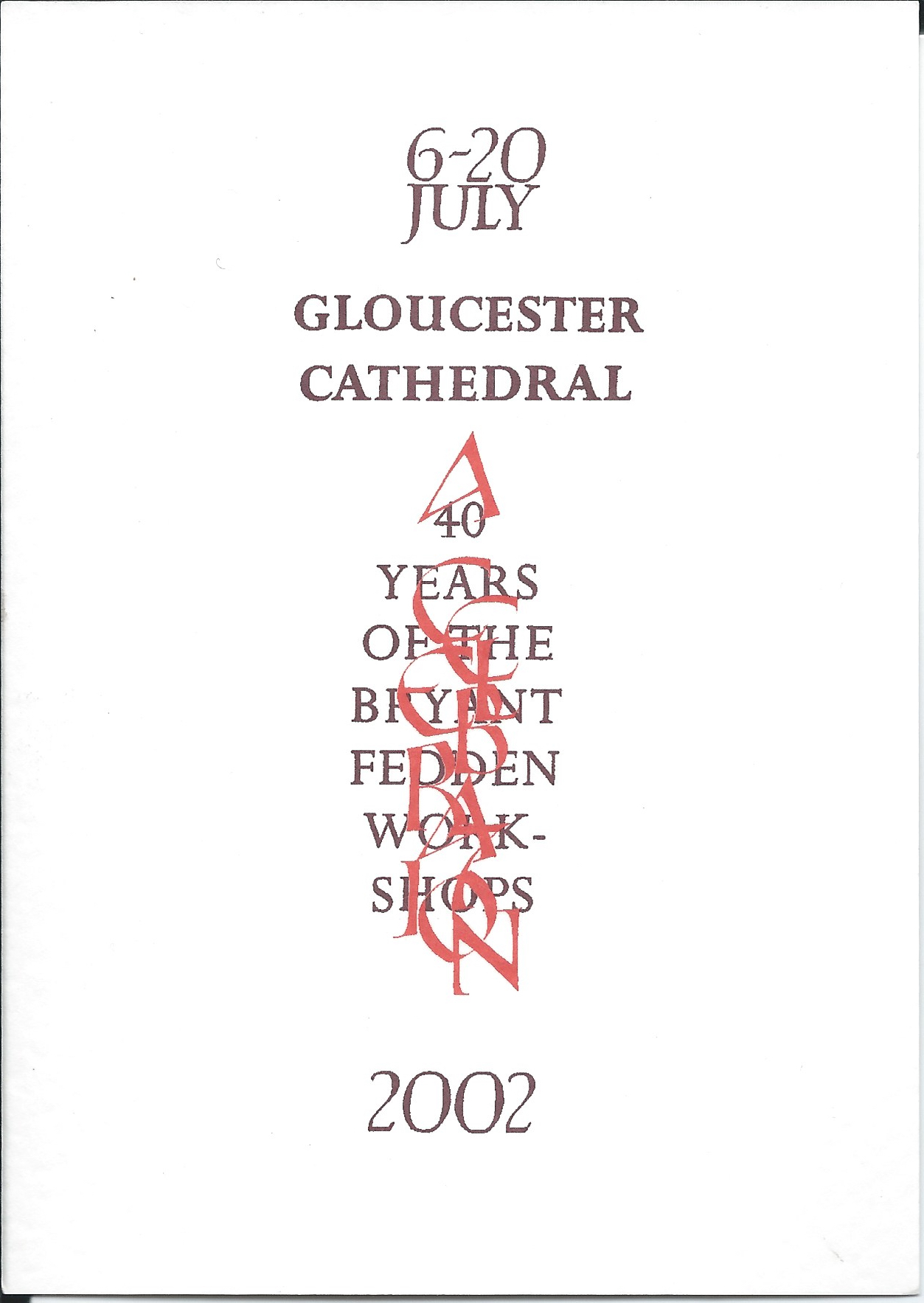
The Invitation Card to the "40 Years of Bryant Fedden Workshops: A Celebration" Exhibition at Gloucester Cathedral - Calligraphy by Bryant Fedden

In May 2003 Bryant Fedden and his son Matthew Fedden took part in the "Spring into Life!" exhibition at Hay Farm, Cliffords Mense, Gloucestershire.

The Gloucester Guild of Craftsmen celebrated their 80th anniversary with an exhibition at The Beacon Hall, The Painswick Centre, Painswick, between 15–18 August 2013. The Cheltenham art e.bulletin featured the exhibition and included the following:

"To continue the celebrations of our 80th Anniversary year there will be an exhibition looking back at some of the Guild's internationally renowned members such as Bryant Fedden and Gerry Carter."

== Institutional memberships ==
Bryant Fedden joined the Gloucester Guild of Craftsmen in 1962.

He was a brother of the Artworkers Guild 1971 - 2004.

Fedden was a member of the South West Arts' Visual Arts and Crafts Advisory Panel and in 1988, he was a founder member of the Letter Exchange, a network to support those working in calligraphy, lettering and typography.

== In Memoriam Award ==
In 2005 The Gloucestershire Guild of Craftsmen created a Bryant Fedden Award Scheme to support artists and craftspeople at the beginning of their careers. Craftspeople supported through the Bryant Fedden Award Scheme include: Sarah Pearson Cooke, Matthew Tradgett, Emily-Kriste Wilcox and Tim Parry-Williams
