= Jokerman =

Jokerman may refer to:

- Jokerman (song), by Bob Dylan, 1983
- Jokerman (typeface), created in 1995
