= Braggadocio =

Braggadocio may refer to:

- Braggadocchio, a fictional character in the epic poem The Faerie Queene
- A braggart or empty boasting
- Braggadocio (rap), a type of rapping
- Braggadocio (typeface), a typeface
- Braggadocio, Missouri, a community
