= Ray Larabie =

Canadian font designer

- Born: 1970 (age 55–56); Ottawa, Ontario, Canada
- Occupations: Typographer, Type designer
- Years active: 1996–2025
- Known for: Designing novelty computer fonts

Raymond Larabie (born 1970 in Ottawa, Ontario) is a Canadian typographer and type designer. He founded Typodermic Fonts in 2001 and launched his Larabie Fonts free-font project in 1996. In 2008 he moved to Nagoya, Japan, incorporating the foundry in 2011. Larabie is best known for display typefaces such as Coolvetica (1999) and Pricedown (used for the Grand Theft Auto logo), and for releasing Canada 150 (2015), along with hundreds of his other older typefaces, into the public domain.

== Biography and career ==
Snasm
- Sample

Larabie was born in Ottawa, Ontario, Canada. In his self-published autobiography, he states that he spent much of his childhood in the cottage country of the Ottawa Valley, an isolated environment that did not allow him to have traditional friendships or social activities, and thus spent much of his time learning computers and typography; he graduated from Sheridan College with a degree in classical animation, a field that was largely obsolete by the time he received his degree. Larabie was employed at Rockstar Canada and had contributed his designs to multiple video game titles, including the hit series' Grand Theft Auto and Max Payne, before he quit the company in 2002 to focus full-time on type design, after having released a series of freeware fonts over the Internet under the brand LarabieFonts since 1996. Larabie worked as a video-game artist at Rockstar Toronto until 2002. While he did not design fonts for the company directly, his 1999 Pricedown font was later used in the logo of the Grand Theft Auto series. He moved to Nagoya, Japan in 2008 after marrying a woman from Nagoya; he maintains his Canadian citizenship and returned to the country briefly in 2017 to celebrate its sesquicentennial.

Larabie primarily specializes in novelty typefaces that are intended for use in desktop publishing and graphic design. The logo for Grand Theft Auto, for instance, uses Larabie's Pricedown font, made available in or before January 1998, which is based on the logo for the international game show The Price Is Right. In addition to game shows, Larabie has also used 1960s and 1970s graphic logos, computer emulation, and other inspirations to design his fonts; most of his designs are display faces not meant for body text, with Larabie acknowledging that he had difficulties with italic type and, especially in his early career, had difficulties adapting katakana and hiragana to his designs. He is particularly known for his "ubiquitous futuristic and sci-fi fonts"; Larabie specialized in that style early in his career because he felt that, other than a few examples such as Bank Gothic, Microgramma and Eurostile, the market for that style was underserved.

Two of his typeface families, Marion and Superclarendon, are released with macOS. Larabie's "Canada 150" is an extended version of his previous font Mesmerize (in turn based on 1920s calligraphic German sans-serifs such as Semplicità, Nobel and Kabel) with Cyrillic and First Nations alphabets included; it was commissioned by the Government of Canada to be the official typeface for the country's sesquicentennial. The government paid him nothing for the custom work, which he subsequently placed into the public domain. He would proceed to release large portions of his Larabie Fonts library (inasmuch as he could, since some of the designs were derived from freeware that turned out to be copyrighted and thus could not be re-released), along with less successful designs for Typodermic, into the public domain in 2020, 2022 and 2024. In 2025, he indicated that he had largely stopped producing new fonts due to diminishing returns but would continue to maintain the fonts in his existing library that had not yet been uncopyrighted.

Larabie has drawn controversy for releasing fonts freely; even his commercial typefaces are typically priced at levels substantially lower than his competition, a decision that Larabie acknowledged was partly due to his rushed approach to fontmaking and, at least in his earlier years as an amateur designer, lack of attention to specific details and his desire to see his work used by multiple clients, which prompted him to price his fonts affordably, provide customization services and increase his attention to detail in regard to how a font looks on a screen as opposed to print. other professional designers (among them Graphics Designers of Canada president Adrian Jean and competing type designer Rod McDonald) took particular umbrage at Canada 150, arguing that the government should have paid for a professionally drawn type because it had the money to do so, because not doing so would be a vote of no confidence in up-and-coming Canadian designers, and that professional designers would publish a superior product. Larabie responded to the criticism by noting that he appreciated that Canada had chosen a work by a Canadian artist (contrasting it with the use of Helvetica, of Swiss origin, on Canadian money) and said "You can't just throw a couple hundred grand at a problem and that's the solution for every problem." He noted that when he had previously attended typography conferences, he had received the cold shoulder from attendees who felt he was threatening their business. In another case, attorneys for Metallica sent Larabie a cease and desist order over one of his freeware fonts, Pastor of Muppets, for having taken letter designs from Metallica's wordmark; though Larabie maintained that, as Americans, they could not claim copyright over character designs as they did not meet a threshold of originality, he complied with the order (also noting that the use of the Muppets name could have drawn further trademark challenges), but found that the font had been too widely distributed to withdraw it from all the sites that had begun distributing it. Metallica never pressed any further action and Larabie, in his autobiography, stated that he wanted nothing further to do with the font and would never release it again.

Larabie's typefaces have been used across various industries. Coolvetica has appeared in video game branding and commercial packaging. Permanence was chosen for the 2023 reissue of Alvin Toffler's Future Shock. Sinzano was used in King's Crown organic tea packaging. Hoverunit appeared in the bilingual monograph Dia Al-Azzawi, and Carouselambra was used in posters for Amsterdam's Freak Festival.

== Notable Typefaces ==
- Coolvetica (1999) – a 1970s–style display font with tight kerning and decorative curls; widely used in packaging and games.
- Superclarendon (2007) – slab-serif font bundled with macOS.
- Neuropol—a modified version of which was used in the wordmark for the 2006 Winter Olympics (PD)
- Carouselambra – a psychedelic display font inspired by Led Zeppelin, used in artwork for the Freak Festival in Amsterdam.
- Pricedown—used for the logo of Grand Theft Auto. Based upon Pinto Flare.
- Stereofidelic (PD) – freeware typeface inspired by 1960s lounge records
- Mesmerize, inspired from Nobel (PD)
- Kawashiro Gothic, Japanese gothic typeface based on the Mesmerize typeface
- Canada 150 (2015) – adaptation of Mesmerize for English, French, and Indigenous scripts, created for Canada's sesquicentennial.
- Canada 1500, based on the Mesmerize typeface; supports Greek, Cyrillic, Vietnamese, and Canadian Aboriginal syllabics (PD)
- Blue Highway, based upon the American highway sign typeface (PD) and its commercial counterpart Expressway
- Permanence – a slab serif inspired by the original 1970s Future Shock cover; later used on its 2023 reissue.
- Ethnocentric

== Samples ==
Fonts by Ray Larabie
Pricedown, as seen in the Grand Theft Auto wordmark

Coolvetica (top, compared to its inspiration Helvetica below) is, according to Larabie, his most downloaded font by far.

Korataki, Larabie's most purchased commercial font, is used in the wordmark for video game Mass Effect.

Stereofidelic

Neuropol (modified) in use in the Torino 2006 wordmark

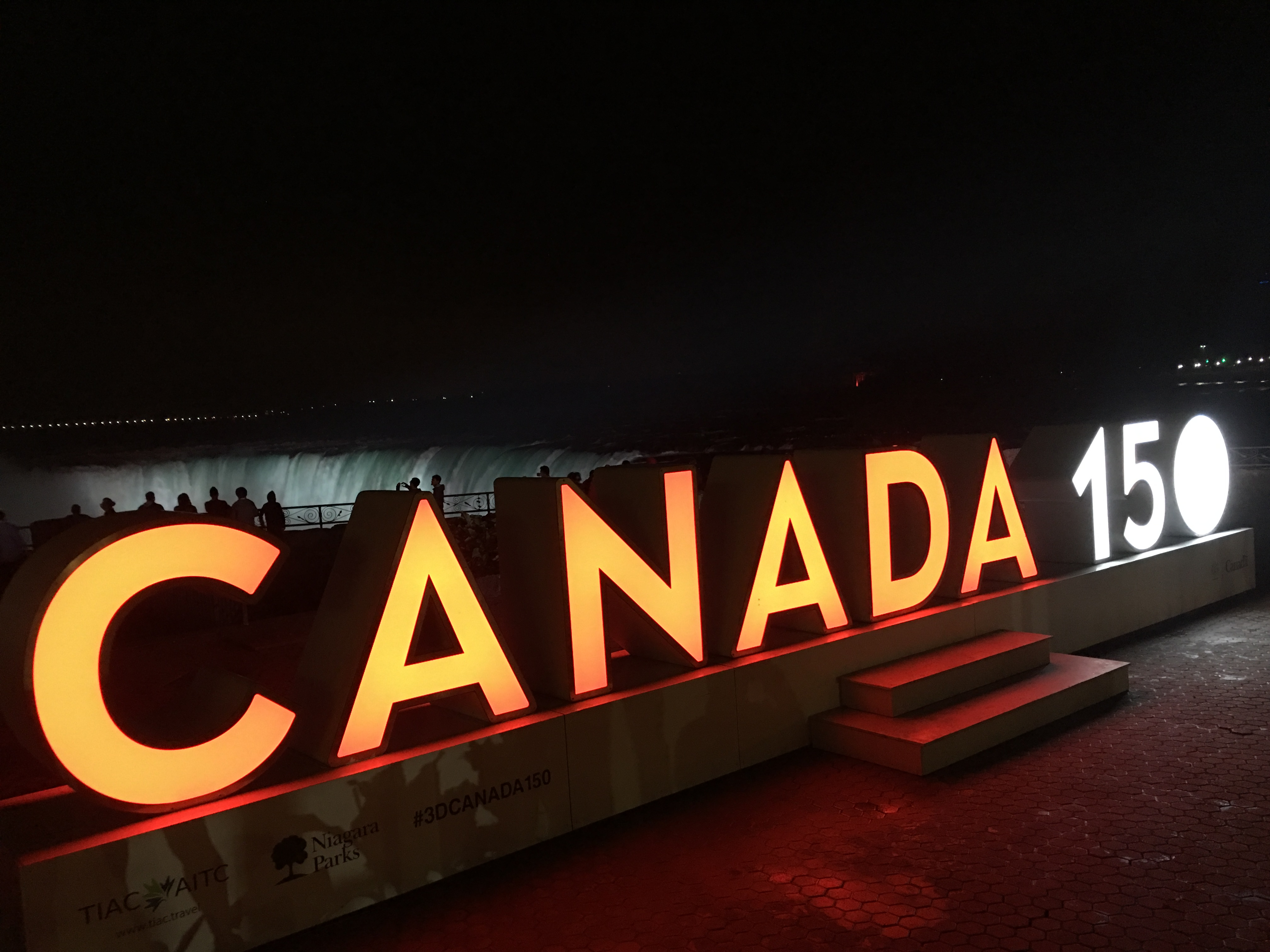
Canada1500 (Mesmerize) in use for its original purpose on the Canada 150 wordmark

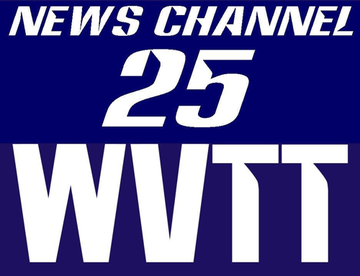
Anklepants, a font based on Westinghouse Broadcasting wordmarks, in use in a former logo for WVTT in Olean, New York

Baveuse, in use in the wordmark for the 2009 TV series Archer

Fragile Bombers, in use in the wordmark for the TV series The Man in the High Castle

== See also ==
- Open-source Unicode typefaces
- List of type designers
- Cartier (typeface)
