= Ellington (typeface) =

Display typeface

- Category: Display
- Designer(s): Michael Harvey
- Foundry: Adobe
- Date created: 1988
- Sample

Ellington is a typeface for display use designed by Michael Harvey licensed from Monotype. It was designed in 1990 and it is named after Duke Ellington. The face has a large x-height and combines features of a modern serif typefaces with calligraphic elements.

== See also ==
- Samples of display typefaces
