= Arnold Böcklin (typeface) =

- Category: Serif
- Designer: Otto Weisert
- Foundry: Linotype
- Date created: 1904
- Re-issuing foundries: Adobe

Arnold Böcklin is a typeface for display use that was designed in 1904 by Schriftgiesserei Otto Weisert foundry. It was named in memory of Arnold Böcklin, a Swiss symbolist painter who died in 1901.

Probably the best-known Art Nouveau typeface, the font had a renaissance in the 1960s and 1970s as part of the general Art Nouveau revival in popular design. Its influence can be seen in the work of illustrators such as Roger Dean and the Stuckist artist Paul Harvey. It is also popularly seen on Donovan's 1960's album cover.

== Design characteristics ==
Arnold Böcklin is highly stylized, following Art Nouveau aesthetic principles in vogue at the time of its design. Many letters feature an unorthodox bottom-heavy contrast, and are adorned with swooping, botanical ornaments. The underlying skeletons of the letterforms are primarily based on classical Roman forms, but occasionally borrow from Uncial and Blackletter, as seen in letters like “H”, “N”, “M”, as well as the single-story “g” and the looped “k”. Due to its highly ornamental nature, Arnold Böcklin is primarily suitable for typesetting at large display sizes.

== Usages ==
Arnold Böcklin 3556 is commonly used in editorial design, branding, and advertising. Its versatility allows it to function effectively in both large display settings, such as headlines and posters, and smaller text sizes, including body copy and captions. The typeface has been embraced by various industries, including publishing, fashion, and corporate branding.

Because it was included in early versions of CorelDRAW software under the name "Arabia", it became connected with Middle East and Oriental themes and used in a variety of contexts, from kebab restaurants to colonial shops, despite having little in common with actual Arabian lettering.

The font has been used in:

- The title of the television show That '70s Show.
- James Blunt's album Back to Bedlam.
- The title of the sitcom The Cuckoo Waltz.
- The Metro / Liceu sign over the Las Ramblas subway entrance in Barcelona.
- The logo of White Dwarf magazine from the late 1970s to the early 1980s used the font.
- The box art and splash screen of the video game, Castelian used the font.
- The box art and splash screen of the video game, Minelvaton Saga: Ragon no Fukkatsu used the font.
- The splash screen of the video game, Pharaoh's Tomb used the font.
- The band Dinosaur Jr. has used the font on various album covers.
- Early "Ram's Head" versions of the Electro-Harmonix Big Muff used the font.
- It was used on the title screen of the 1987 videogame, Solomon's Key, developed and released by Tecmo for the Nintendo Entertainment System.
- The 1989 videogame Hippodrome by Data East used it on the title screen.
- The British band Jamiroquai used it for the design of their first album release Emergency on Planet Earth.
- The album cover for the English band Tyrannosaurus Rex's album Prophets, Seers & Sages: The Angels of the Ages (1968).
- The Moody Blues album cover for Every Good Boy Deserves Favour (1971) designed by Phillip Travers.
- The British café chain Patisserie Valerie in its wordmark logo.
- The American band The Turtles used it on their album Happy Together.

== See also ==
- List of display typefaces
