= Caslon Antique =

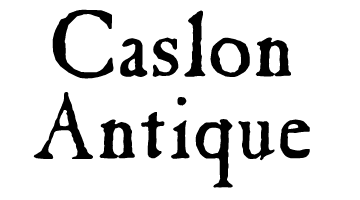
- Category: Display
- Designer: Berne Nadall
- Foundry: Barnhart Brothers & Spindler
- Date created: 1894
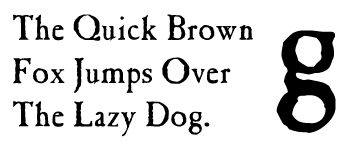
- Sample

Caslon Antique is a decorative American typeface that was designed in 1894 by Berne Nadall. It was originally called Fifteenth Century, but was renamed Caslon Antique by Nadall's foundry, Barnhart Bros. & Spindler, in the mid-1920s.

The design of the typeface is meant to evoke the Colonial era. Early printers would reuse metal type over and over again, and the faces would become chipped and damaged from use. Caslon Antique emulates this look.

== Variants ==
An italic variant of the font is also available.

In addition to versions available under the traditional name, Corel produces its own version of the font under the name "Casablanca Antique."

== Notable uses ==
Caslon Antique is popular today when an "old-fashioned" or "gothic" look is desired.

It was used in the opening credits of the Jacques Rivette film La Belle Noiseuse. It is used by the musical group The Sisters of Mercy and Sepultura on their albums, for the logo of the musical Les Misérables, and for the covers of the books in A Series of Unfortunate Events. It is also frequently used on historical displays. It is used for the Warhammer role-playing game. It is also used in the logo of Fogo de Chão, a Brazilian chain of rodízio-style steakhouses (churrascarias).

The 1985 reboot of the TV series The Twilight Zone uses it. Most recently, it has been used on promotional material for the smash musical Monty Python's Spamalot on Broadway, the West End, and its tour of the United States. British band The The also used the font in several of their music videos, usually displaying several lyrics from the song in the opening scenes. It used on the cover of Regina Spektor's album Begin to Hope. Caslon Antique is also the main font used by Smuttynose Brewing Company in Portsmouth, New Hampshire. The font is also used in some circumstances of the 2009 children's show Horrible Histories.

== See also ==
- Samples of display typefaces
