= Michael Harvey (lettering artist) =

English lettering artist (1931 –2013)

Michael Harvey MBE (11 November 1931 – 18 October 2013) was an English lettering artist, teacher, and writer specialising in lettering, type design, and letter cutting. His work appears in many English cathedrals and on the National Gallery, London.^{1}

Originally he was inspired by reading Eric Gill's Autobiography. In the early 1950s, he learned stone carving from Joseph Cribb. He worked as Reynolds Stone's assistant between 1955 and 1961. He then became a freelance, producing some 1500 hand-lettered book jackets over the next twenty years for major publishers such as Heinemann, The Bodley Head, and Cambridge University Press. As technology changed he developed his interest in type, producing designs for Adobe Systems and The Monotype Corporation and later, with Andy Benedek for his own foundry, Finefonts. His inscriptional work included a long collaboration with Ian Hamilton Finlay. He gave talks and demonstrated widely and taught for a number of years at Poole Art College and later ran the Letterforms course at Reading University with James Mosley.

He designed a number of typefaces, including Zephyr, Andreas, Mentor, Strayhorn, and Ellington. In 2012, he published under his own 47 Editions imprint Adventures With Letters, an extensively illustrated memoir of his working life.

He was an active member of The Double Crown Club, The Wynkyn de Worde Society, ATypI, Letter Exchange, and The Edward Johnston Foundation.

In 2022, the Lettering Arts Centre in Suffolk, England, mounted a retrospective of Harvey's work.

== Select bibliography ==
- Harvey, Michael. Letters into words. London: s, 1973.
- Harvey, Michael. Lettering design: form and skill in the design and use of letters. London: Bodley Head, 1975.
- Harvey, Michael. Creative lettering, drawing and design. London: Bodley Head, 1985.
- Harvey, Michael. Carving letters in stone and wood. London: Bodley Head, 1987.
- Harvey, Michael. Calligraphy in the graphic arts. London: Bodley Head, 1988.
- Harvey, Michael. Reynolds Stone: engraved lettering in wood. Netheron: Fleece Press, 1992.
- Harvey, Michael. Creative lettering today. London: A. & C. Black, 1996.
- Harvey, Michael. Adventures With Letters. Bridport: 47 Editions, 2012
