= Lithos =

Lithos Pro
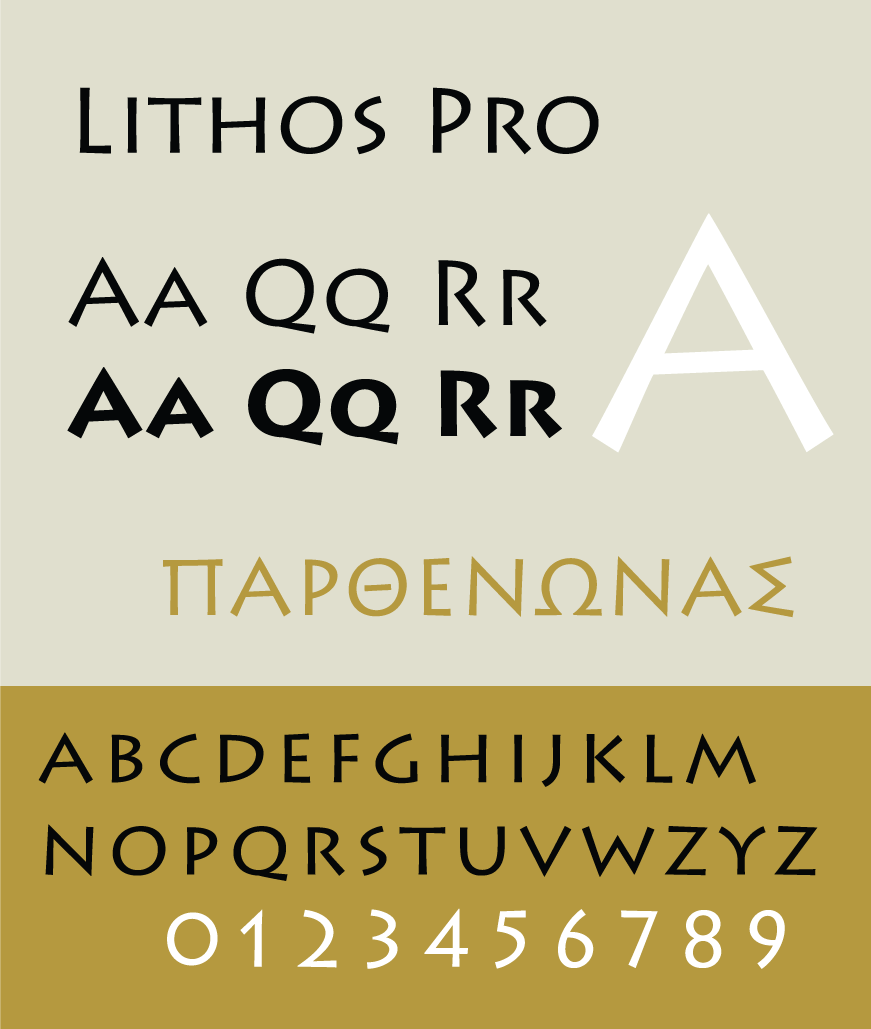
- Category: Sans-serif
- Classification: Incised, Display
- Designer: Carol Twombly
- Foundry: Adobe Type
- Date released: 1989

Lithos is a glyphic sans-serif typeface designed by Carol Twombly in 1989 for Adobe Systems. Lithos is inspired by the unadorned, geometric letterforms of the engravings found on Ancient Greek public buildings. The typeface consists of only capital letters, no lowercase, and comes in five weights, without italics.

According to Twombly, Lithos only used Greek inscriptions as inspiration, making Lithos more of a modern reinterpretation than a faithful reproduction. Twombly also designed Trajan and Charlemagne based respectively on ancient Roman and Byzantine inscriptions. Those typefaces, unlike Lithos, were modeled more directly upon their historical counterparts. One example of Lithos' departure from historical accuracy is the inclusion of bold weights, which never existed in historical Greek inscriptions.

== Lithos Pro ==
In 2000, Adobe released the OpenType version called Lithos Pro, which included Adobe CE, Adobe Western 2, Greek character sets support, and small caps in the lowercase positions. OpenType features include alternates, case forms, proportional lining figures, small caps.

== Lithos in popular culture ==
Lithos was the resident typeface of MTV during the late 1980s and early 1990s.

Lithos is used in the California State Parks logo.
