= Stereofidelic =

Grotesque sans-serif display typeface

- Category: Grotesque sans-serif, display
- Designer(s): Ray Larabie
- Foundry: LarabieFonts
- Date released: August 19, 2001
- License: CC0
- Trademark: Larabie
- Sample

Stereofidelic is a sans-serif typeface designed as a freeware display type by Ray Larabie in the late 1990s.

== Origin ==
The Stereofidelic font is based on the lettering on a 1960s lounge record, which in turn is an altered version of grotesque sans-serif typefaces, with each letter rotated a small, random number of degrees and/or raised or lowered a small percentage from the baseline to give the appearance of randomness. The typeface is all-caps, with no lowercase letters. The designated uppercase and lowercase I are both dashed arrows, with the capital pointing upward and the lowercase pointing downward. The exclamation points are solid arrows.

Stereofidelic was one of the early Larabie Fonts, most of which were given away for free (with some licensing restrictions) and were designed as novelty typefaces for use in graphic design. In April 2024, Larabie placed the work into the public domain.
