= Jokerman (typeface) =

Typeface

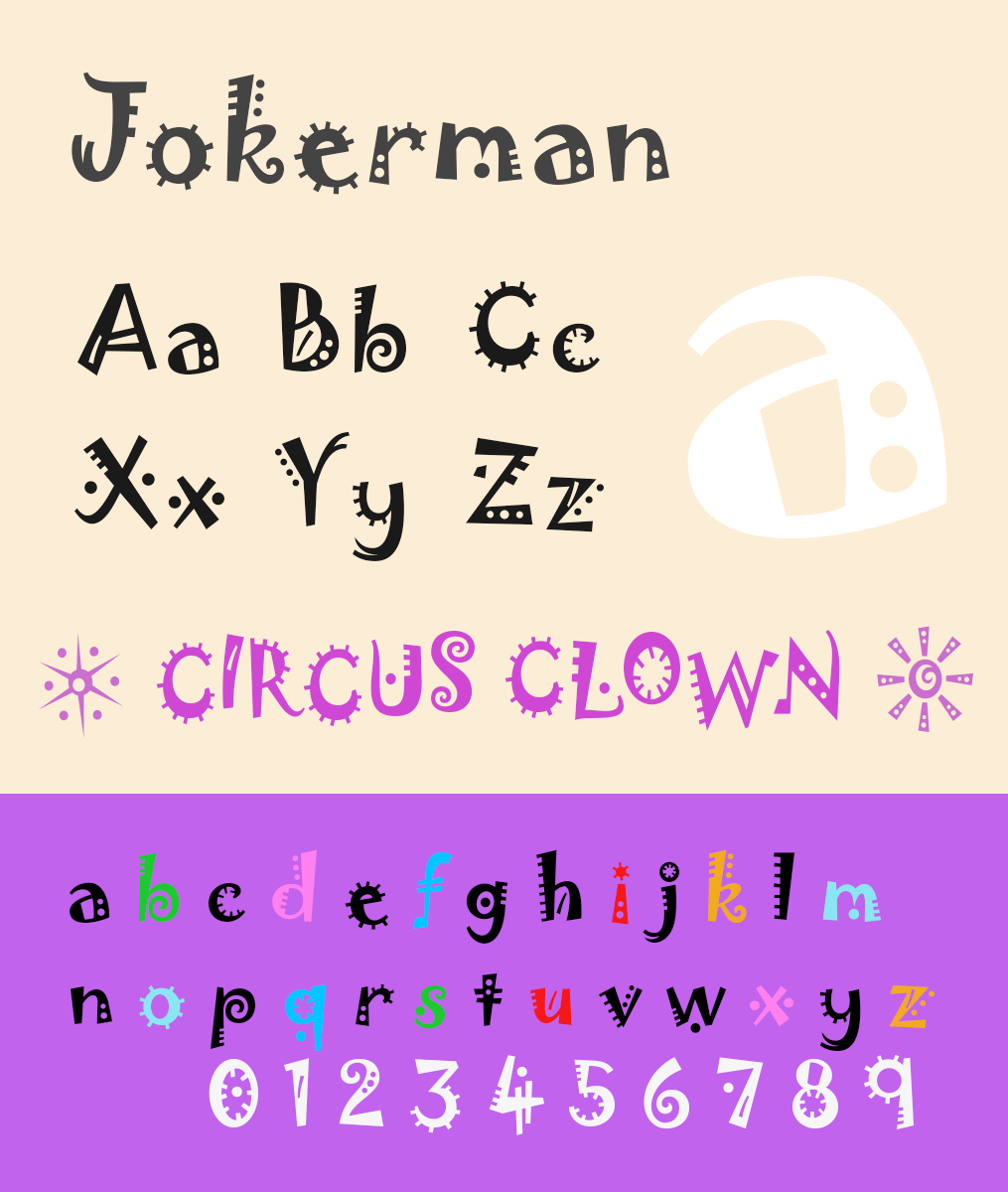
- Category: Decorative
- Designer: Andrew K. Smith
- Foundry: Microsoft, International Typeface Corporation
- Date created: 1995

Jokerman is a decorative typeface created in 1995 by British designer Andrew K. Smith. It employs dots, spirals and straight lines that can be either attached or placed near each letter or integrated into the character to create negative space. It is described by Microsoft as having "fanciful internal and external elements". Smith named the typeface after the Bob Dylan song "Jokerman".

International Typeface Corporation has issued two Jokerman typefaces: Jokerman and Jokerman Hellenic. Jokerman Hellenic includes glyphs for the Greek alphabet.

A satire piece in The Washington Post said that the font "feels like an invitation to an arts-and-crafts party", while an article in The Daily Telegraph said it was "more of a game than a font".

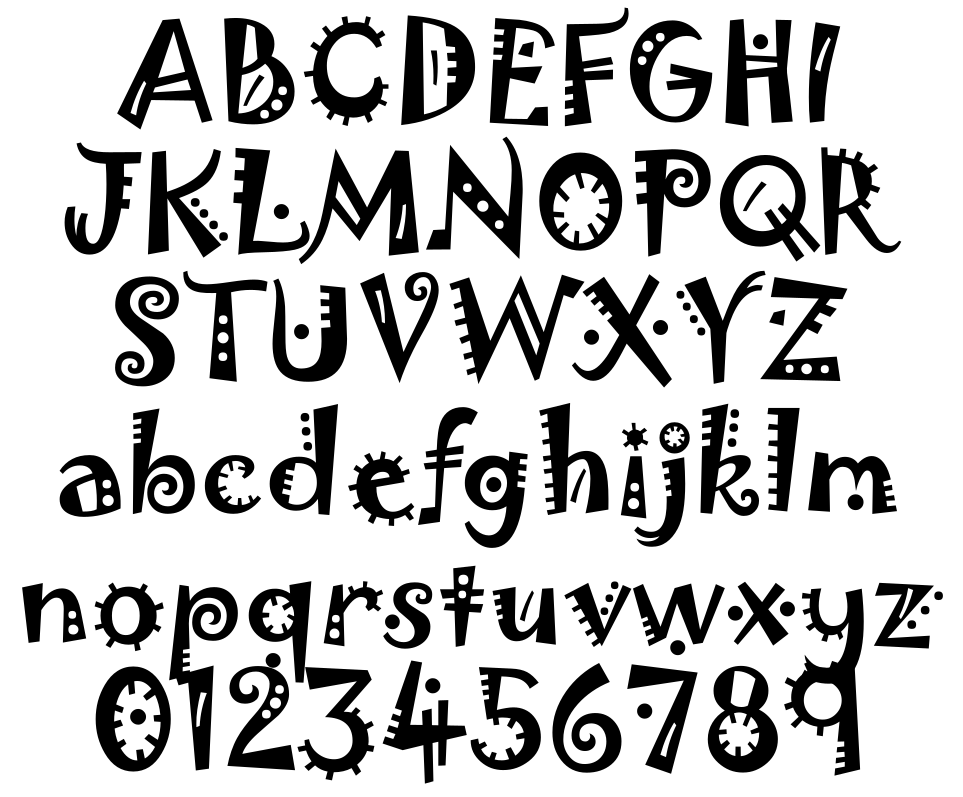
Typeface sample

== See also ==
- Samples of display typefaces
