= Berne Nadall =

American typeface designer

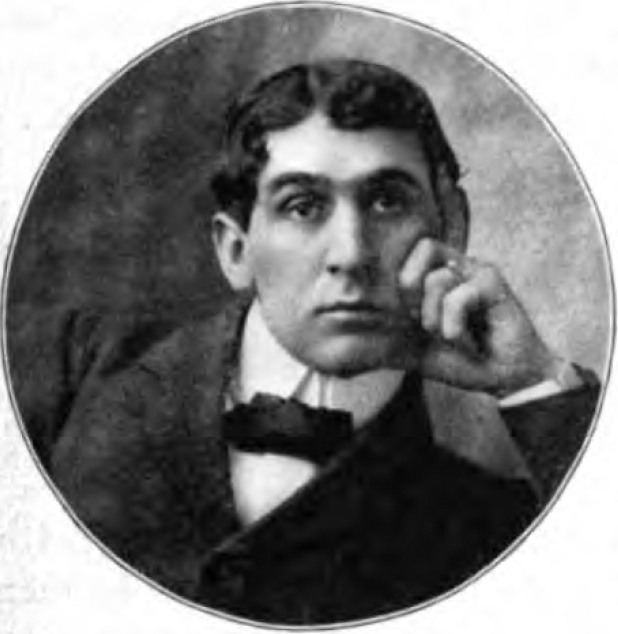
Berne Nadall

Bernard William "Berne" Nadall (1869–1932) was an American typeface designer and an artist. He was the designer of the Caslon Antique typeface.

== Life ==
Bernard was born in Louisville, Kentucky on February 28, 1869. His mother was a French art teacher. After her death, he was placed under the instruction of H. Clay Wool Ford, a prominent artist of the South. However, they did not work well together.

Nadall began studying with Al Legras, a classmate of Carl Brenner. He went to the Louisville School of Design and, in less than a year, began working for the two Louisville daily papers: the Louisville Post, and the Daily Commercial. It was during his work with the Post that he cartooned the "Newman Ward Granite Steal," an exposé of a swindle on the city. This resulted in a lawsuit against the paper with damages of $200,000. Because of this, he left Louisville for Chicago, where he worked in decorating and design. His services were highly sought by printers and publishers.

Eventually, he began designing initials, head and tailpieces, page ornaments, and titles. He found congenial work for Barnhart Brothers & Spindler, the "Great Western Type Foundry", of Chicago. Here Nadall designed the Caslon Antique typefaces. He was determined to study abroad, so he went to Birmingham, England, and Paris, France. He eventually returned to Birmingham.

== Legacy ==
Nadall's Caslon Antique has maintained status as an enduring and popular typeface. It has since been utilized in a number of popular works, including Les Misérables, A Series of Unfortunate Events, and the 1985 reboot of the TV series The Twilight Zone.
