= Louis Oppenheim =

German graphic artist, painter and type designer

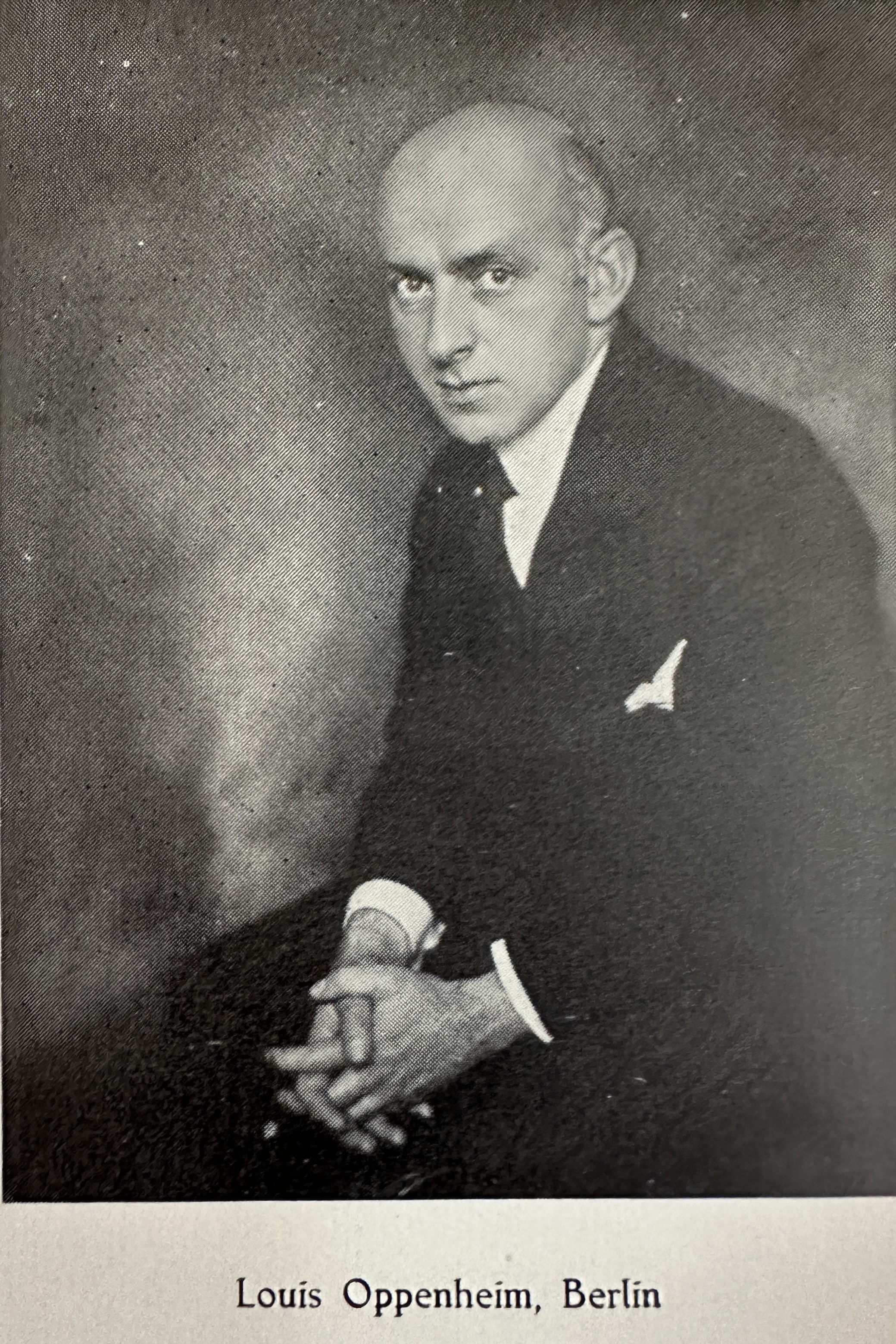
- Graphic designer Louis Oppenheim
- Born: 1879; Coburg
- Died: 1936 (aged 56–57)
- Occupations: German graphic artist, painter and type designer

Louis Oppenheim (1879–1936) was a German graphic artist, painter and type designer.

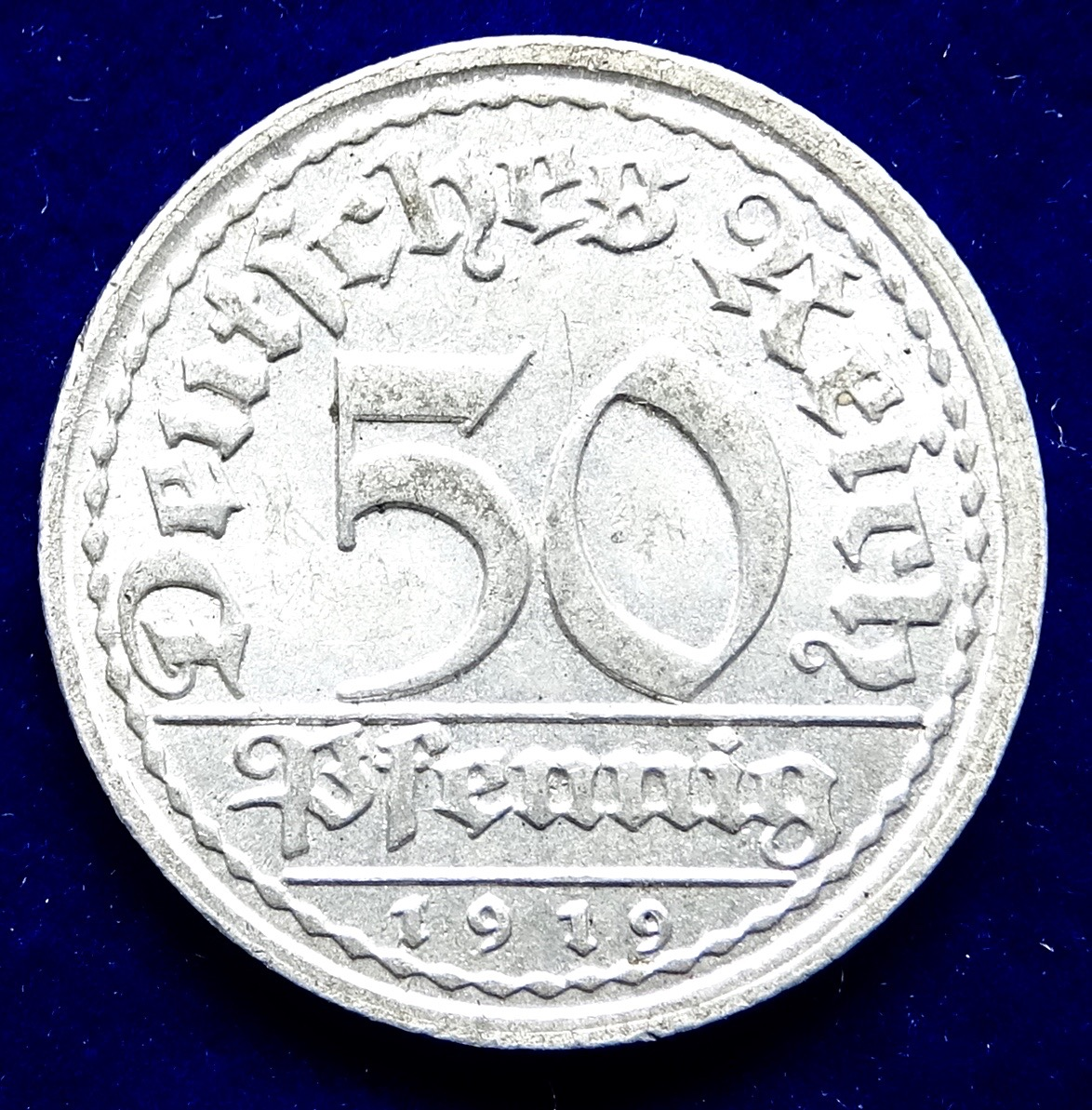
Obverse of the first coin of the Weimar Republic. Design by Louis Oppenheim.

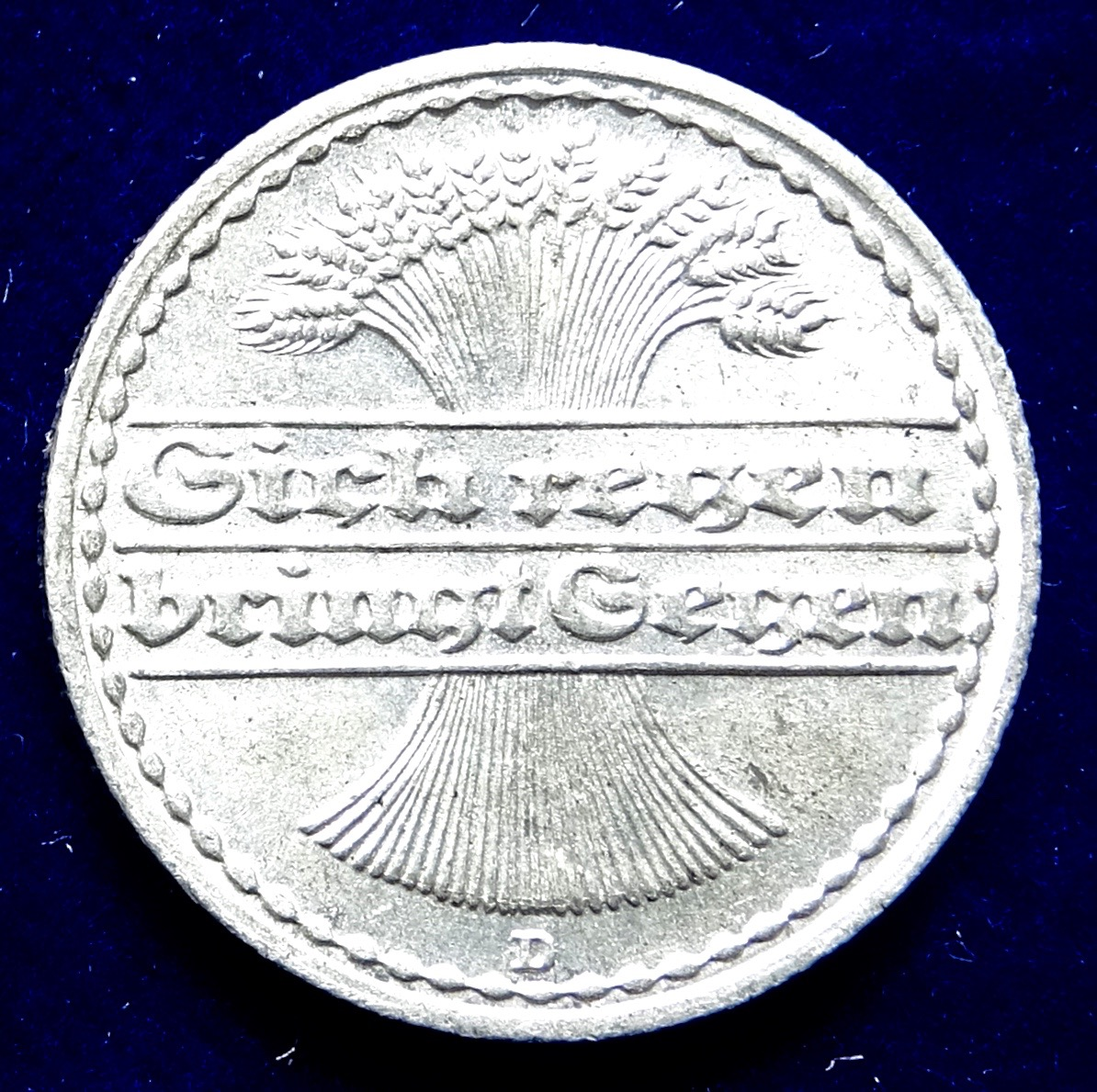
Reverse of the first coin of the Weimar Republic. Design by Louis Oppenheim.

Born in Coburg, Oppenheim studied in London from 1899 to 1906. He moved to Berlin and started his work as a graphic artist in 1910, signing his work with his initials, "LO" and working for clients such as AEG, the Reichsbahn, Persil and Adrema. His posters are considered a significant product of the 'Berlin poster style'. Oppenheim worked for the type foundry Berthold and created a handful of significant and widespread typefaces, all of which share modernist characteristics, such as Lo-Type and Fanfare which are still in wide use today. Also, he designed the first coin of the Weimar Republic in 1919.

== See also ==
- Lo-Type
- Erik Spiekermann
