= Solare (typeface) =

Grotesque sans-serif typeface

- Category: Sans serif
- Classification: Grotesque
- Designer: Nikolas Wrobel
- Foundry: Nikolas Type
- Date released: January 2024
- Glyphs: 748
- License: Proprietary software
- Sample
- Website: nikolastype.com/fonts/solare
- Latest release version: 1.0
- Latest release date: January 2024

Solare is a grotesque sans serif typeface designed by Nikolas Wrobel, a graphic designer based in Cologne, Germany. The typeface was released in January 2024 through Wrobel's type foundry, Nikolas Type.

== Background ==
The name Solare is derived from the Italian words for sun and solar energy. Wrobel aimed to encapsulate the beauty of human nature and emotions by distilling complex shapes into their simplest forms.

Solare integrates both traditional and contemporary design elements, resulting in a clean and sharp aesthetic influenced by both sans-serif and serif typefaces.

The initial release of Solare includes more than 748 glyphs, encompassing uppercase and lowercase letters, numerals, punctuation marks, diacritics, ligatures and various symbols.

The typeface supports a wide range of European languages that utilise the Latin alphabet, as well as Japanese. It is versatile, suitable for use in web design, graphic design, logos, e-books, and applications.

Solare is available for download in OTF and WOFF file formats and is also offered as a variable font. As proprietary software, it is closed source and requires users to agree to specific software licensing terms.

== See also ==
- Type design
- Typography
- Font
