= Andreas (typeface) =

- Category: Display
- Designer(s): Michael Harvey
- Foundry: Adobe
- Date created: 1988
- Sample

Andreas is a humanist serif typeface designed by Michael Harvey, and licensed from the Adobe Type library. Harvey drew the lettering in 1988 as part of the book-jacket design for James F. Peck's book In the Studios of Paris: William Bouguereau and His American Students, a Yale University Press publication. That lettering became the foundation for the 1986 typeface Andreas.

In keeping with the book's subject, Harvey wanted letterforms that reflected the Art Nouveau period. The letterforms also bear comparison with the condensed, calligraphic thirteenth-century Italian monumental capitals. Due to space constraints, the type had to be narrow enough to allow the title to fit on a single line across the top, so as to not intrude on the Van Gogh painting that filled the rest of the jacket. To accomplish this he drew the letterforms freehand, giving them highly animated organic strokes and narrow character set. He also added distinctive junctions of letter strokes to the D, P, and R. The typeface was drawn in outline, intending to reverse to white, so as to not be overly assertive on the cover.
