= Coolvetica =

Grotesque sans-serif display typeface

- Category: Neogrotesque sans-serif, display
- Designer: Ray Larabie
- Foundry: LarabieFonts (original)
- Date released: September 7, 1999
- Re-issuing foundries: Typodermic Fonts (later variants)
- License: Freeware (TFDL, semibold weight); Proprietary (other weights)
- Design based on: Derivatives of Helvetica
- Variations: Compressed; Condensed; Crammed
- Trademark: Typodermic Fonts, Inc.

Coolvetica is a neogrotesque sans-serif typeface designed as a freeware display type by Ray Larabie in the late 1990s. It is indirectly based upon Helvetica.

== Origin ==
Ray Larabie released Coolvetica on September 7, 1999. It was an attempt to capture the logotype aesthetic of the 1970s, when designers often customized Helvetica into more playful and tightly spaced forms. The Stop & Shop supermarket logo from 1973 to 1982 was the main reference point. Its distinctive lowercase t, shaped like a reversed J, became the seed for the design. The font was made from scratch in Fontographer (his usual choice of font development software), expanding the curly theme of the t into other letters such as the j and y, which were given full curls. Larabie also deliberately tightened the kerning of the letters by removing the small curves in the lower-right corners of glyphs such as a and R to bring them perpendicular to the baseline.

The first release was released under a free license as optional donationware. In 2009, this version was deprecated and a new version was released, bearing a full range of weights from Ultra-Light to Heavy, along with italics, which removed certain symbols (such as arrows that had been encoded in the positions of the less than and greater than signs, and a star in the bullet position) and revised some of the hacks in the original with more modern OpenType features to bring the font into compliance with modern encoding standards; these later variants required a commercial license, with one weight—the semi-bold, corresponding to the original release—remaining available under a modified license still free for most uses. A later addition added a series of condensed and compressed versions, which were formed by shrinking the characters and using vertical lines to increase their heights back to their standard heights (thus, characters such as 0 and O resemble rounded rectangles instead of ellipses as with a traditional method of condensation).

== Impact ==
Coolvetica is, by far, Larabie's most popular font. Florence Deygas and Olivier Kuntzel used Coolvetica for the design work of the 2002 film Catch Me if You Can, which they remarked was due to the font's evocation of the 1960s and the works of graphic designers such as Saul Bass and Paul Rand. Larabie remarked in his autobiography that though it was originally meant to evoke the aesthetics of the 1970s, its widespread popularity instead led to it becoming evocative of its own era of the turn of the millennium.
