= Braggadocio (typeface) =

Geometric sans-serif display typeface

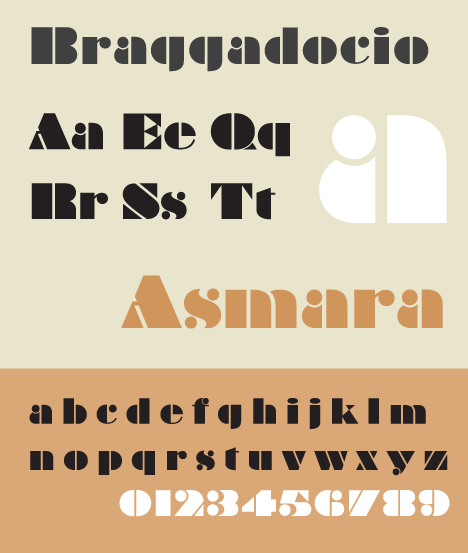
- Category: Geometric sans-serif Display
- Designer(s): W.A. Woolley
- Foundry: Monotype Corporation
- Date created: 1929–1930
- Design based on: Futura Black

Braggadocio is a geometrically constructed sans-serif stencil typeface designed by W.A. Woolley in 1930 for the Monotype Corporation. The design was based on Futura Black.

Though a stencil face, Braggadocio bears comparison with the heavier weighted Didone "fat face" fonts. A product of the Art Deco era, Braggadocio shares similarities with Architype Albers and Futura Black, the typeface used in the wordmark of Au Bon Pain, a U.S. restaurant-bakery chain.

The lowercase characters a, f, c, s and y have terminals similar to the Fat Face model. The face is atypical in that none of the characters has a circular hole.

== See also ==
- Stencil (typeface)
- Samples of display typefaces
