= Nilland =

Slab serif typeface

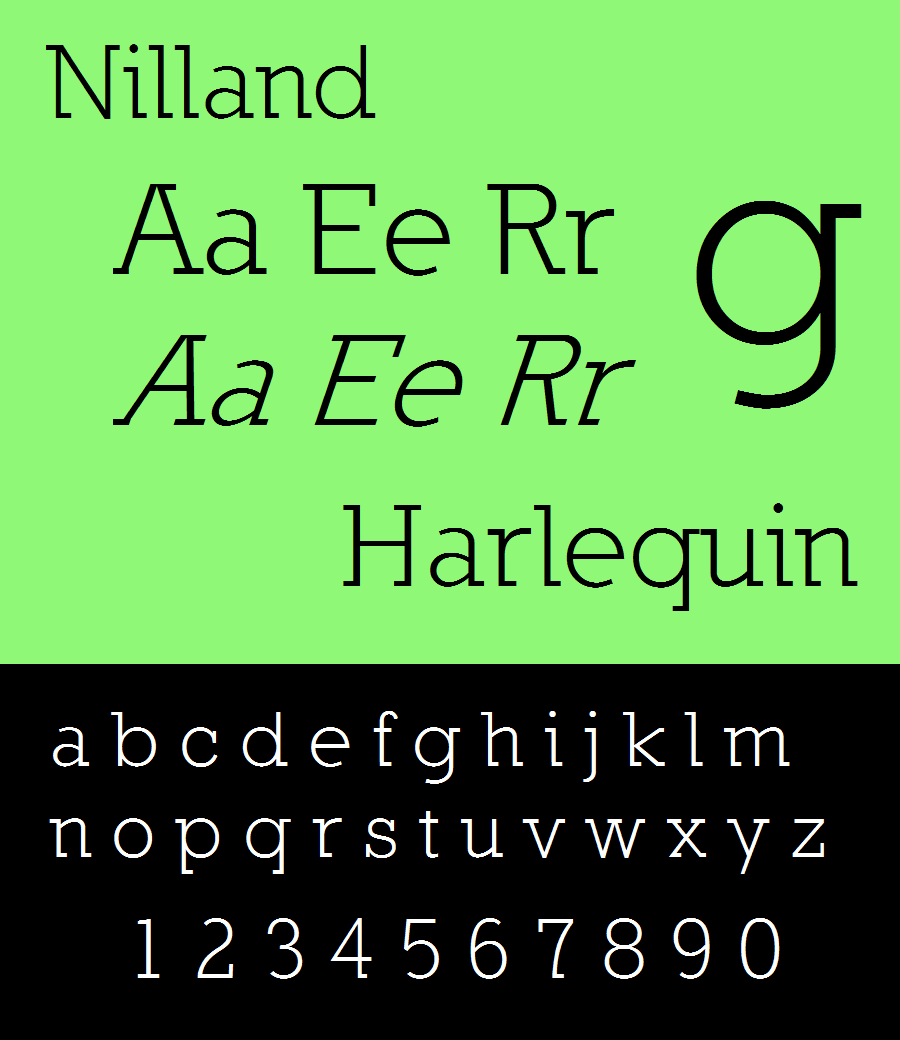
- Category: Serif
- Designer: Manfred Klein
- Date released: March, 2005

Nilland is a serif typeface designed by Manfred Klein. It is primarily intended for headers, not body text.

== Variants ==
There are five main variants of Nilland:

- Nilland-Black
- Nilland-Bold
- Nilland-ExtraBold
- Nilland-SmallCaps
- Nilland-SmallCaps-Bold

== Unicode ranges ==
Nilland contains support for characters in 9 different Unicode ranges:

- Basic Latin
- Latin-1 Supplement
- Latin Extended-A
- Latin Extended-B
- Spacing Modifier Letters
- General Punctuation
- Letterlike Symbols
- Mathematical Operators
- Private Use Area
