= Letter Exchange =

Letter Exchange is a professional organization dedicated to the promotion of lettering in all media. Letter Exchange was founded in the United Kingdom in 1988. It organizes lectures held at the Art Workers Guild, publishes its journal Forum twice a year, and also organizes exhibitions. Its international membership is open to professionals as well as interested amateurs.

== See also ==
- Calligraphy
- Lettering
- Typography
