= Rockwell =

Rockwell may refer to:

== Arts and entertainment ==
=== Music ===
- Rockwell (musician) (Kennedy William Gordy, born 1964), 1980s R&B musician and son of Motown Records founder Berry Gordy
- Rockwell (album), a 2009 mini-album by Anni Rossi

=== Film ===
- Rockwell, a 1994 film about Porter Rockwell
- Rockwell, a fictional town and setting of They Hunger
- Rockwell, Maine, a fictional town in the 1999 film The Iron Giant

== Business ==
- Rockwell International, a former defense company in the United States
  - Rockwell Automation, an industrial automation company that descended from Rockwell International
  - Rockwell Collins, a communications and aviation electronics company that also descended from Rockwell International
  - Rockwell Semiconductor, a semiconductor company that also descended from Rockwell International, now known as Conexant
- Rockwell Diamonds, a mid-tier high-value gem diamond producer based in South Africa and headquartered in Canada
- Rockwell Tools, a line of power tools owned and distributed by China-based Positec Tool Corporation

== People ==
- Rockwell (surname), a list of people with the surname
- Rockwell (given name), a list of people with the given name

== Places ==
=== Ireland ===
- Rockwell, a townland in County Tipperary
- Rockwell Lake, a lake in County Tipperary

=== Philippines ===
- Rockwell Center, an upscale urban area in Makati, Philippines

=== United Kingdom ===
- Rockwell Green, a village in West Somerset, England

=== United States ===
- Rockwell, Alaska, original name of Juneau
- Rockwell, Arkansas, a census-designated place
- Rockwell, Iowa, a city
- Rockwell City, Iowa, a city
- Rockwell, Kansas, a ghost town
- Rockwell, North Carolina, a town
- Rockwell, Washington
- Rockwell Field, a defunct United States Air Force base, San Diego, California
- Rockwell Lake, a lake in Minnesota
- Rockwell Township, Norman County, Minnesota
- Mount Rockwell, Montana
- Rockwell Run, West Virginia, a tributary of the Potomac River

== Other uses ==
- Rockwell (typeface), a typeface designed by Monotype Imaging and released in 1934
- Rockwell College, a secondary school in South Tipperary, Ireland
- Rockwell Light, a lighthouse in Oshkosk, Wisconsin, United States
- Rockwell (CTA), a station on the Chicago Transit Authority's Brown Line
- Rockwell, the original name for Intel's microarchitecture released in second half of 2014 (now called Broadwell)
- Rockwell Hall, at Duquesne University, Pittsburgh, Pennsylvania, U.S.
- Rockwell Rovers, a GAA and hurling team in Ireland
- Rockwell Formation, a geological formation in West Virginia, Maryland, and Pennsylvania
- Rockwell scale, a scale of material hardness
