= Rockwell (surname) =

Rockwell is an English surname. Notable people with the surname include:

- Dick Rockwell (1920–2006), American comic strip and comic book artist, nephew of Norman Rockwell
- Francis W. Rockwell (politician) (1844–1929), American politician
- Francis W. Rockwell (1886–1979), American Navy Admiral
- George Lincoln Rockwell (1918–1967), American politician and Neo-Nazi leader
- George Lovejoy Rockwell (1889–1978), American vaudeville performer and radio personality
- Irvin E. Rockwell (1862–1952), American politician
- Kiki Rockwell (born 1995), New Zealand musician
- John Rockwell (born 1940), American music critic and dance critic
- Julius Rockwell (1805–1888), American politician
- Lew Rockwell (born 1944), American author and political consultant
- Norman Rockwell (1894–1978), American painter and illustrator
- Porter Rockwell (c. 1815–1878), American bodyguard and frontiersman
- Sam Rockwell (born 1968), American actor
- Stuart W. Rockwell (1917–2011), American politician
- Thomas Rockwell (1933–2024), American author and son of Norman Rockwell
- Victoria Rockwell, president of the American Society of Mechanical Engineers
- Willard Rockwell (1888–1978), American businessman and engineer
- William W. Rockwell (1824–1894), American politician
- Claire Schade, later Claire Rockwell, (1893–1991), American vaudeville actress
