= Frank Hinman Pierpont =

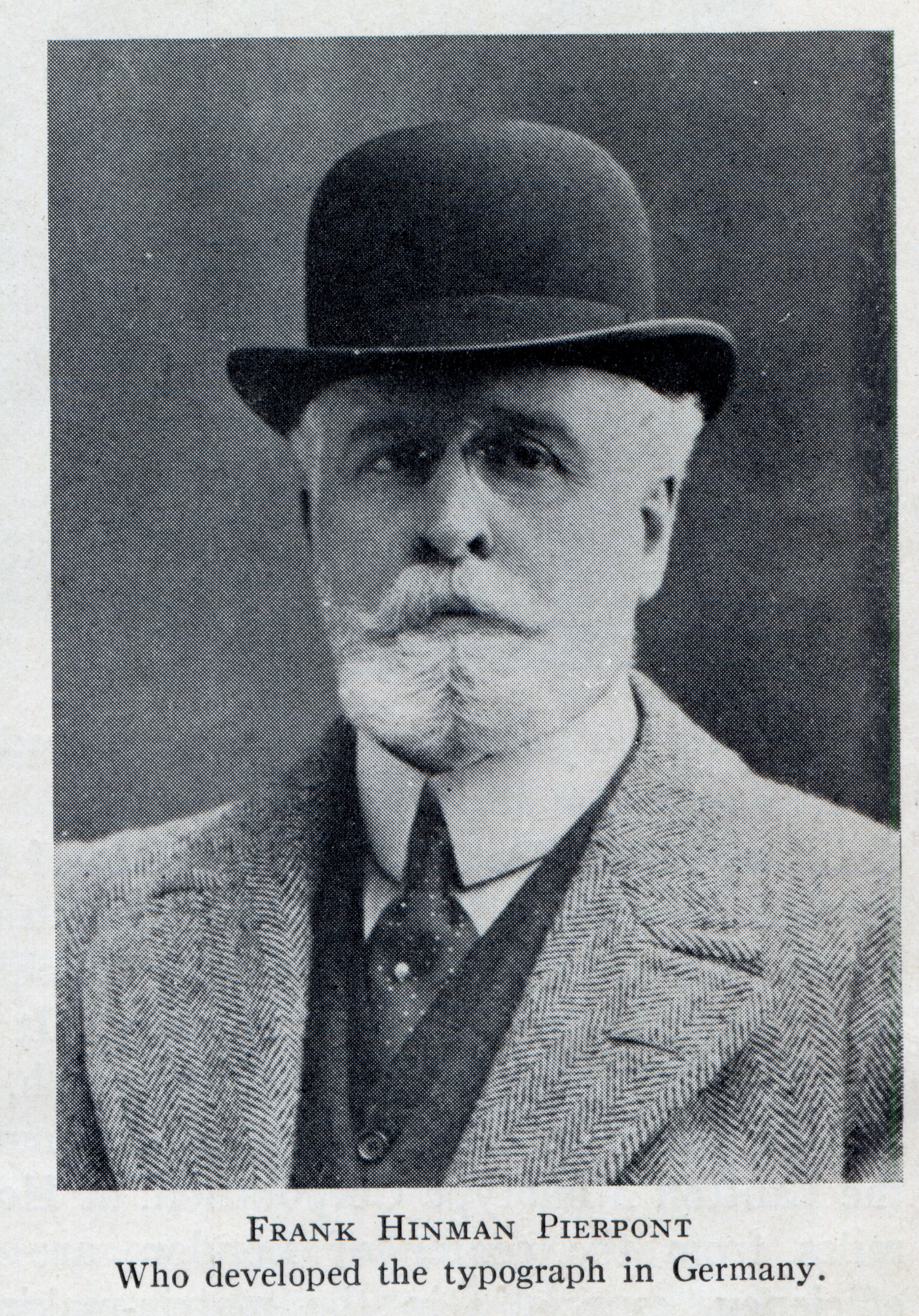
- Born: 1860; New Haven, Connecticut, United States
- Died: 1937 (aged 76–77); England, United Kingdom
- Known for: typography
- Notable work: Plantin

Frank Hinman Pierpont (born 1860, New Haven, Connecticut – died 11 February 1937, England) was an American engineer and typeface designer. He worked primarily in England for the Monotype Corporation of Britain.

After training as a mechanic in Hartford, Connecticut, Pierpont began employment in 1886 with a patent office where he worked on a typesetting machine. Leaving for Europe in 1894, by 1896 he became a director of Typograph Setzmaschinen-Fabrik, a German manufacturer of typesetting machines.

Beginning in 1899 and continuing until 1936, a year before his death, Pierpont first helped to establish and then acted as factory manager and later board member of the British branch of Lanston Monotype in Salfords, Surrey, England. While working for Monotype he supervised the reproduction of revivals of classic type designs and new designs such as Times New Roman. He reportedly had doubts about the artistic ambitions of Monotype's artistic adviser Stanley Morison and publicity manager Beatrice Warde, complaining in one 1920s memo of the Gill Sans typeface, then in development, that "I see nothing in this design to recommend it and much that is objectionable."

In his spare time Pierpont enjoyed growing roses. He retired as Works Manager in 1936 and became a Consulting Engineer with a seat on the board, an occasion marked by a dinner at the Savoy Hotel, but died the following year.

== Typefaces designed by F. H. Pierpont ==
All faces cut by British Monotype:

- Imprint with Fritz Stelzer
- Plantin (1913), with Fritz Stelzer
- Horley Oldstyle (1925), named for Horley, the nearest town to Monotype's works. An amiable serif similar to Goudy Old Style and Kennerley.
- Monotype Grotesque (1926), an updating of the Berthold Type Foundry’s Ideal Grotesque.
- Bembo (1929) revival supervised by Pierpont, following his previous Poliphilus and Blado designs on the same theme
- Rockwell (1934)
