= Plantin (typeface) =

Typeface

- Category: Serif
- Classification: Old style serif
- Designers: Robert Granjon; Frank Hinman Pierpont; Fritz Stelzer
- Foundry: Monotype
- Date created: 1913

Plantin is an old-style serif typeface created in 1913 by the British Monotype Corporation for their hot metal typesetting system. Named after the sixteenth-century printer Christophe Plantin, it is loosely based on a Gros Cicero roman type cut in the 16th century by Robert Granjon held in the collection of the Plantin–Moretus Museum in Antwerp.

The intention behind the design of Plantin was to create a font with thicker letterforms than were often used at the time: early printing on absorbent book paper led to ink spread, but by 1913 innovations in smoothing and coated paper had led to reduced ink spread and made old types often look skeletal on paper. Monotype engineering manager Frank Hinman Pierpont visited the Plantin-Moretus Museum, where he acquired a printed specimen of historic types.

Plantin was one of the first Monotype Corporation revivals that was not simply a copy of a typeface already popular in British printing; it has proved popular since its release and has been digitised. Monotype followed it with revivals of many other classic typefaces in the 1920s and 30s. Plantin would later also be used as one of the main models for the creation of Times New Roman in the 1930s. The Plantin family includes regular, light and bold weights, along with corresponding italics.

== Inspiration ==
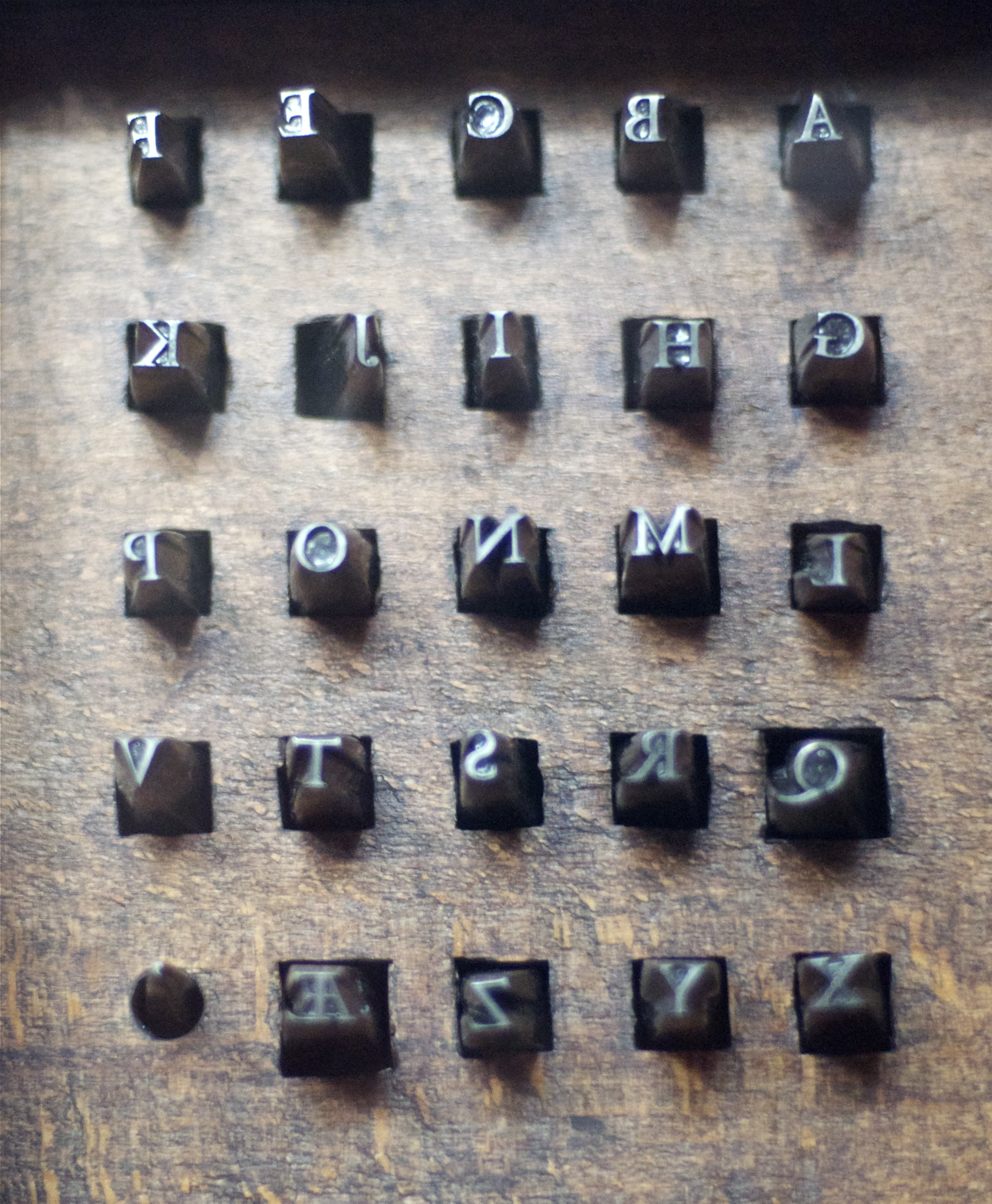
Steel punches, the masters used to stamp matrices used to cast metal type, at the Plantin-Moretus Museum. Its unique collection of original sixteenth-century matrices and punches inspired the Plantin design.

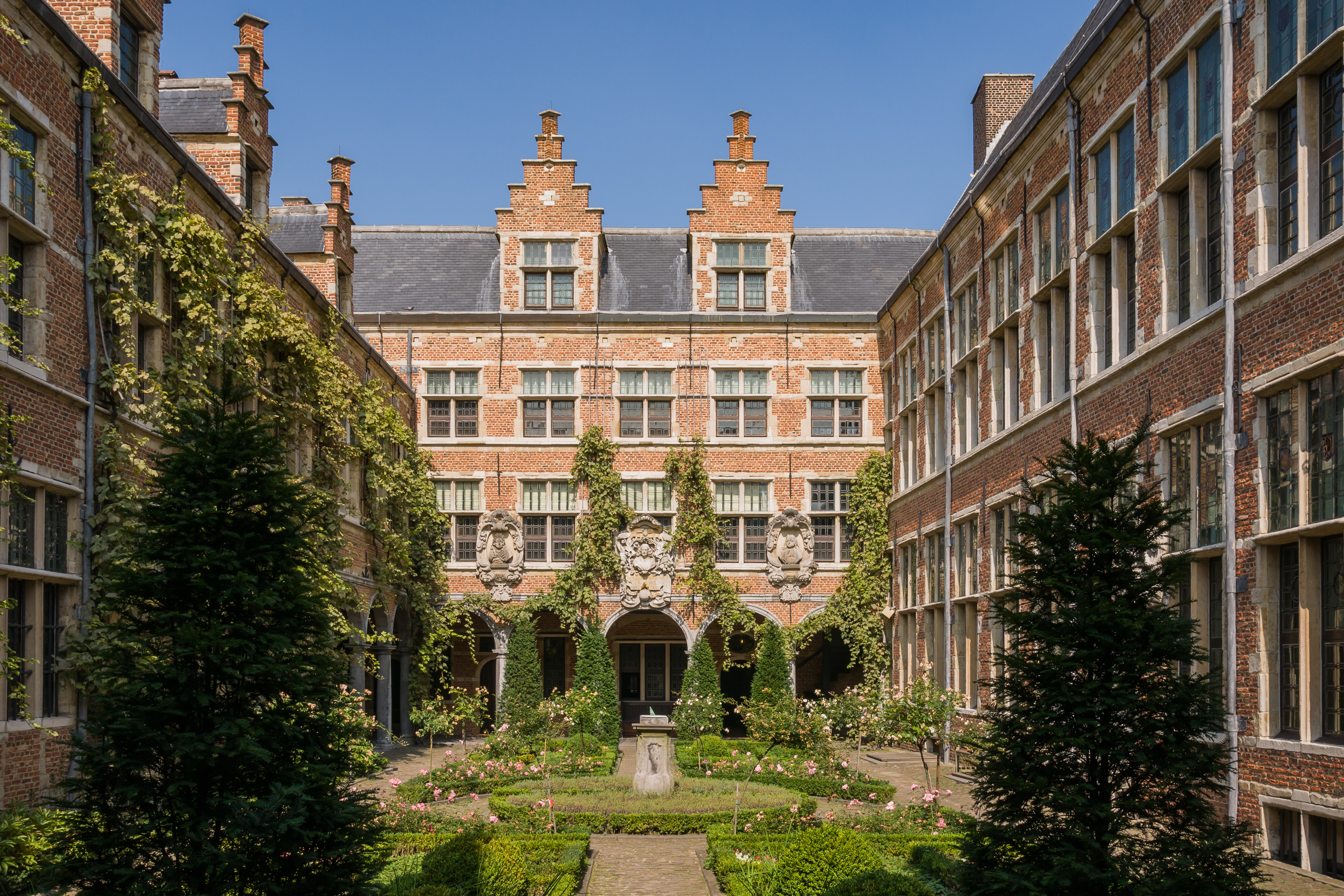
The Plantin-Moretus Museum in Antwerp, a visit to which provided source material for Plantin's design.

At the time Plantin was released, Monotype's hot metal typesetting system, which cast new type for each printing job, was developing a reputation for practicality in trade and mass-market printing, but the designs offered by Monotype were relatively basic choices, such as a "modern" face, an "old style" and a Clarendon.

James Moran and John Dreyfus suggested that an inspiration for the design may have been a c. 1910 family from the Shanks foundry known as "Plantin Old Style", advertised as highly legible. This was actually a bold design based on Caslon, with no connection to Christophe Plantin or Granjon, but Dreyfus suggests it may have prompted Monotype to research Christophe Plantin and the collection of the Plantin-Moretus Museum.

The Plantin-Moretus Museum was created in 1876 from Plantin's collection which had been preserved and added to by his successors in business. It is notable as the world's largest collection of sixteenth century typefaces. Although Plantin commissioned types from Granjon, according to Hendrik Vervliet the specific type Pierpont's design was based on began to be used by the Plantin-Moretus Press only in the 18th century, after Plantin had died and his press had been inherited by the Moretus family. (It has been reported that Plantin did use the long letters of the type as replacement letters to cast a type by Garamond shorter height, but Vervliet suggests that these may have been a set of slightly different characters cut by Granjon separately.)

Plantin was designed and engraved into metal at the Monotype factory in Salfords, Surrey, which was led by Pierpont and draughtsman Fritz Stelzer. Both were recruits to Monotype from the German printing industry.

The choice to revive a French Renaissance design was unusual for the time, since most British fine printers of the period preferred either Caslon or revivals of the fifteenth-century style of Nicolas Jenson (recognisable from the tilted 'e'), following the lead of William Morris's Golden Type, both of which Monotype would also develop revivals of. However, other revivals of Aldine/French renaissance typefaces followed from several hot metal typesetting companies in the following decades, including Monotype's own Poliphilus, Bembo and Garamond, Linotype's Granjon and Estienne and others, becoming very popular in book printing for body text.

== Design ==
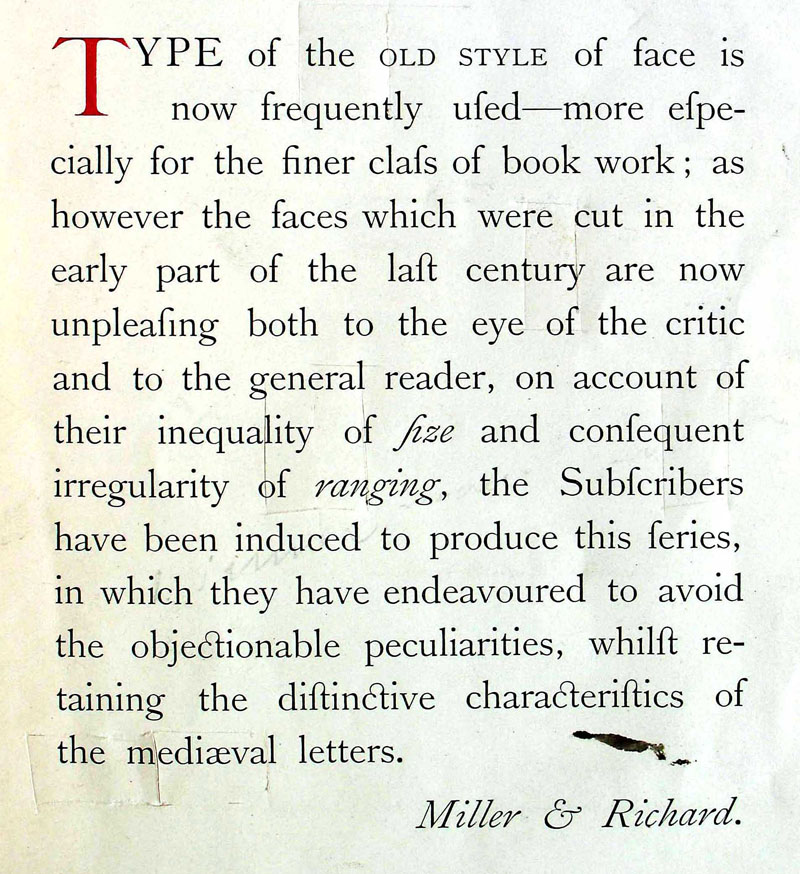
Miller & Richard's Old Style, a delicate reinterpretation of pre nineteenth-century printing styles that became popular in the late nineteenth century. While offering a version of it as one of their first faces, Monotype in creating Plantin aimed to offer a more solid design that would print clearly.

The design for Plantin preserved the large x-height of Granjon's designs, but shortened the ascenders and descenders and enlarged the counters of the lowercase 'a' and 'e'. Not all the letters were Granjon's: the letters 'J', 'U' and 'W', not used in French in the sixteenth century, were not his, and a different 'a' in an eighteenth-century style had been substituted into the font by the time the specimen sheet was printed.

The 1742 specimen of Claude Lamesle (notable for its printing quality) provides a specimen of the Granjon type in its original state. Mosley has close-up images of some characters of the face. (Note: A better-quality digitisation of the whole specimen is available but it does not include this leaf.)

== Reception and usage ==
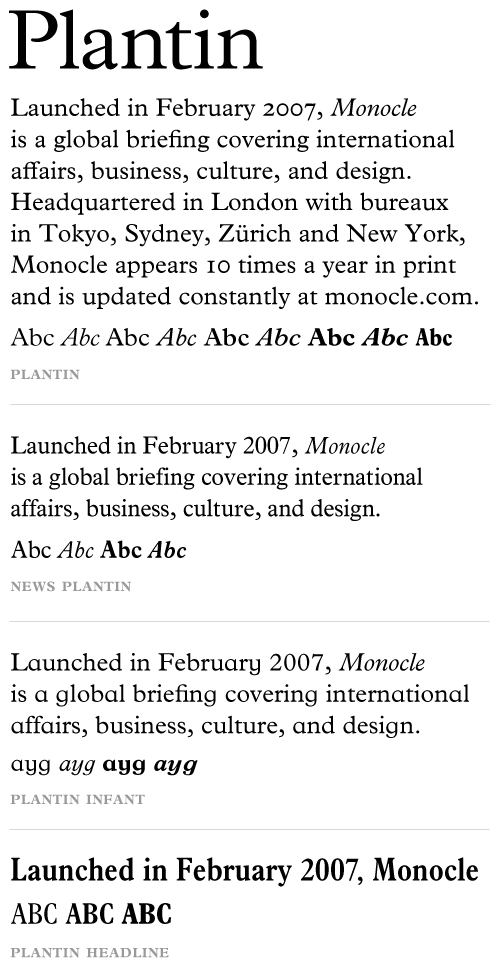
A sample image of Plantin created by Fontshop, showing infant styles and the condensed "News" and "Headline" styles sold for newspapers.

With its relatively robust, solid design compared to the Didone and "Modernised Old Style" faces popular in the early twentieth century (which Monotype already had made versions of), Plantin proved popular and was often particularly used by trade and newspaper printers using poor-quality paper in the metal type period and beyond. Monotype's advertising emphasised its popularity with advertisers, highlighting its use in the "Mrs Rawlins" series of adverts for washing starch. As the basic font is relatively dark on the page, Monotype offered a 'light' version as well as a bold, which Hugh Williamson describes as "particularly suitable for bookwork."

During the interwar period the face was adopted and popularized by Francis Meynell's Pelican Press and by C. W. Hobson's Cloister press, and also used occasionally by Cambridge University Press. A custom version, "Nonesuch Plantin" was also cut for Meynell's Nonesuch Press, one of the first fine printers to use Monotype machines, with extended ascenders and descenders on the lower-case. Type designer Walter Tracy noted that this changed the type's appearance to a surprising extent: "it look[s] not only more refined but as if it derived from another period: Fournier's, say [in the eighteenth century], not Granjon's." It was appropriately used by the Bodley Head to print Meynell's autobiography. Monotype also created a condensed version, News Plantin, for The Observer in the late 1970s. An infant variety of the typeface, called Plantin Infant, also exists, with single-story versions of the letters 'a' and 'g' and a 'y' with two straight sides.

The font was used as the signature font for ABC News from 1978 until 1999. In more recent usage, the magazine Monocle is set entirely in Plantin and Helvetica. The body text of all Magic: The Gathering cards is also set in Plantin.

== Designs inspired by Plantin ==
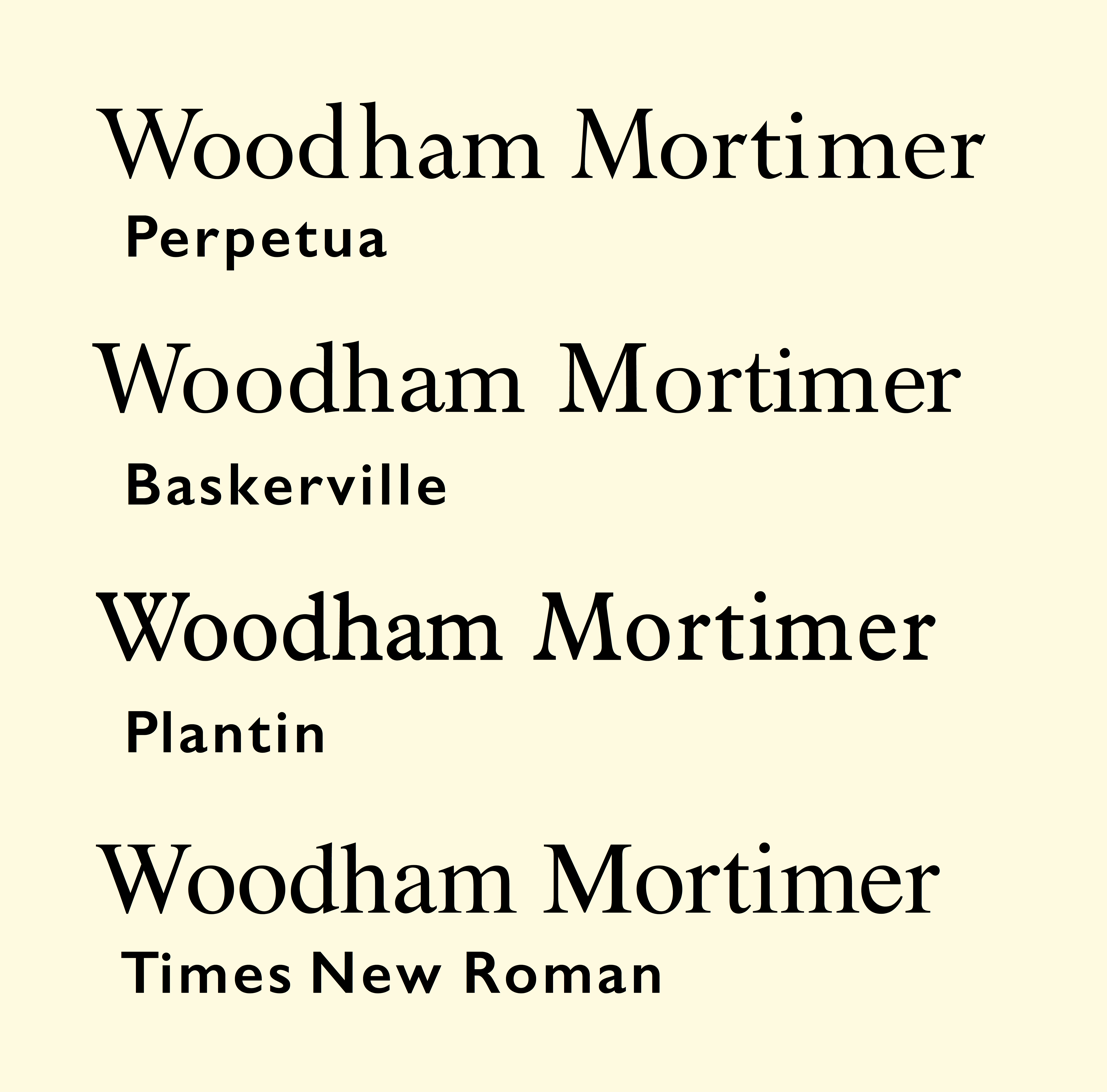
A comparison between Times New Roman and three typefaces originally considered as a basis for the Times project: Perpetua, Baskerville, and Plantin. Times is most based on Plantin, but with taller letters and its appearance "modernised" by adding eighteenth- and nineteenth-century influences similar to Baskerville and Perpetua, in particular enhancing the stroke contrast.

Plantin was the basis for the general layout of Monotype's most successful typeface of all, Times New Roman. Times is similar to Plantin but "sharpened" or "modernised", with increased contrast (particularly resembling designs from the eighteenth and nineteenth century) and greater "sparkle". Allan Haley commented that Times New Roman "looks like Plantin on a diet."

As the Plantin design is in the public domain, adaptations and unofficial digitisations (including simple knock-offs) have been released. Galaxie Copernicus by Chester Jenkins and Kris Sowersby is a reinterpretation of Plantin. Sowersby followed it with a newspaper typeface, Tiempos, influenced by Times New Roman and later, in mid-2023, released a digital revival of the metal Plantin 110 cut itself—rather than a reinterpretation—called Martina Plantijn. Fabric Serif by Sindre Bremnes and Frode Helland of Monokrom Type Foundry is another reinterpretation. Other similar designs include Musee by DSType and Erato by Hoftype. In 2024 The Economist adopted a new typeface Economist Serif designed by Henrik Kubel and based on Plantin.

Aldine 721 is Bitstream's version of Plantin and Francisco Serial is a version by Softmaker.
