= Rockwell (typeface) =

Slab-serif font

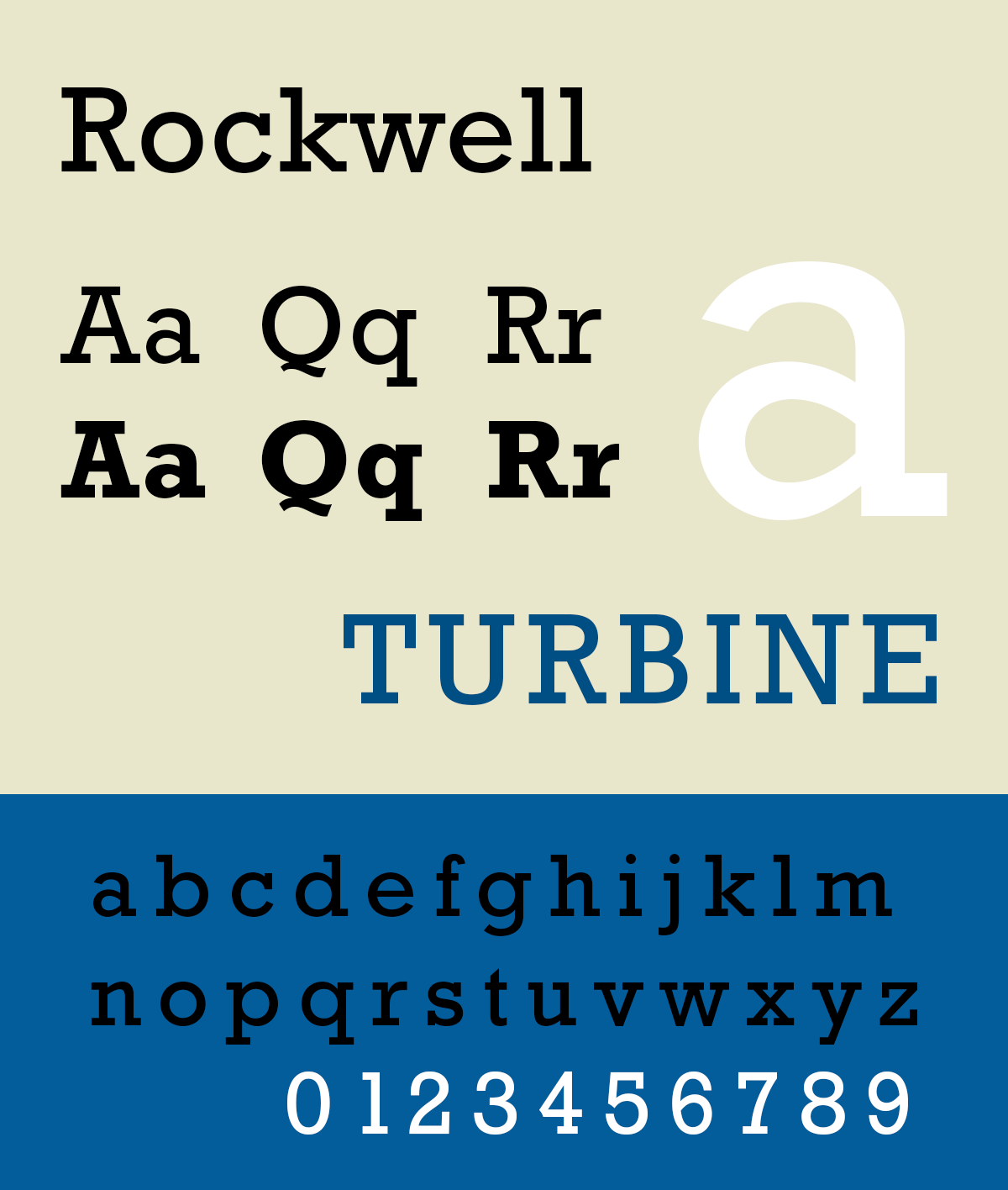
- Category: Serif
- Classification: Slab serif
- Designer: Frank Hinman Pierpont
- Foundry: Monotype
- Date released: 1934
- Re-issuing foundries: Adobe Inc., Monotype Imaging
- Design based on: Stymie; Venus Egyptienne; Litho Antique

Rockwell is a slab serif typeface designed by the Monotype Corporation and released in 1934. The project was supervised by Monotype's engineering manager Frank Hinman Pierpont. This typeface is distinguished by a serif at the apex of the uppercase A, while the lowercase a has two storeys. Because of its monoweighted stroke (meaning there is virtually no visible thick/thin transition in the strokes, so the letterforms are the same thickness all the way around), Rockwell is used primarily for display or at small sizes rather than as a body text. Rockwell is based on an earlier, more condensed slab serif design cast by the Inland Type Foundry called Litho Antique.

Rockwell is a geometric slab-serif with a monoline construction, with all of its strokes appearing to be roughly the same width and its capital O roughly circular. This gives it a similar impression to common sans-serif designs of the period like Akzidenz Grotesk, Franklin Gothic, or Futura. Rockwell is influenced by a style of geometric slab serif that had become popular around the time, including the earlier Memphis and Beton, and less similarly Stymie and City.

Rockwell has remained popular and been digitised, although a shadowed weight has not been.

Bitstream offers a lookalike/clone of Rockwell, under the name Geometric Slabserif 712.

Vernon Adams designed the Rokkitt typeface, inspired by Rockwell.

== Usage ==
The Guinness World Records used Rockwell in some of its early-1990s editions. Informational signage at Expo 86 made extensive use of the Rockwell typeface. Docklands Light Railway used a bold weight of this typeface in the late 1980s and early 1990s. The poetry publisher Tall Lighthouse also uses Rockwell in all of its books, as well as on its website.

The government of Ohio used Rockwell in its previous logo.

Previous local government Strathclyde Regional Council used the Rockwell font in its logo.

American fast food chain Arby's uses Rockwell font in its advertising, most notably in its slogan, "We Have The Meats".

The 2024 film Challengers and its accompanying promotional material notably made extensive use of Rockwell.

Avon and Somerset Constabulary use the typeface prominently, such as in the masthead of their website.
