= Body text =

Text forming the main content of a printed or digital work

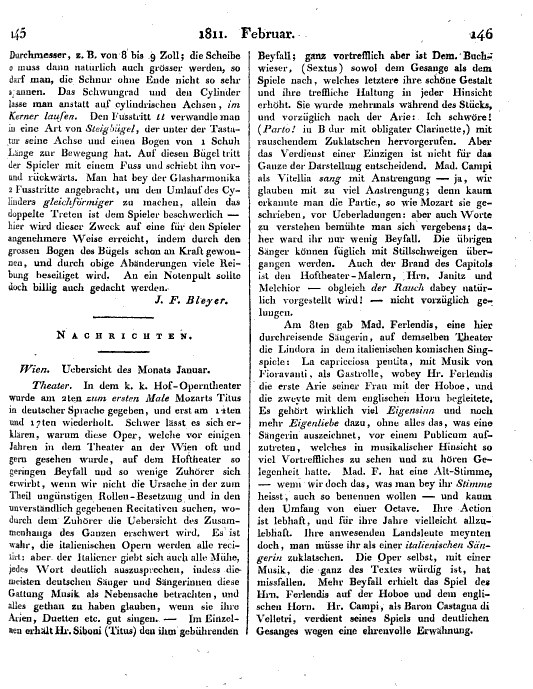
Typical layout of an 1811 body text page, including headers, footers and multiple columns of text

Body text, body copy, or running text is the text forming the main content of a book, magazine, web page, or any other printed or digital work. This is as a contrast to both additional components such as headings, images, charts, footnotes etc. on each page, and also the pages of front matter that form the introduction to a book.

Body text has two slightly different meanings, depending on context. A book designer, concerned with the overall sequence of a book, regards it as those pages that form the majority of a book, containing the body of text or body matter. A typesetter concerned instead with the layout of text on a page sees 'body text' as being those sections of the main text that are flowed into columns or justified as paragraphs, as distinct from the headings and any pictures that are floated out of the main body.

== Book design ==
The 'body matter' is the group of pages that contain the body of the text of the book. The front matter comes before it, containing title pages, content lists, publisher's metadata etc. It is followed by the back matter, which includes appendices, references, credits, colophon etc. The distinction between the parts, body and other, is that the body matter is produced by the author, the front and back matter by the publisher (through the book designer, index collator etc.). Where there is a prose introduction, it demonstrates this; an introduction by the author is considered body matter, an introduction by an editor or other commentator is placed with the front matter. In some technical publications, appendices are so long and important as part of the book that they are a creative endeavour of the author, rather than a mere collation exercise by the publisher. In this case they may, like the introduction, be considered as a part of the body matter.

At one time, books were produced as 'letter-books', where the body of text consisted of chapters of solid text, unillustrated. Where illustrations were provided, these were costly and so plates were inserted in sections, either at the end of the body matter, or grouped within the signatures. Development in printing in the early 20th century, and particularly developments in newspaper design and the incorporation of photographs, encouraged the development of the 'picture-book' where images were mixed in the text and formed part of the body matter itself (although in most cases, this was still outside the paragraphs of the typesetter's body text).

== Typesetting ==
Typesetting of the body text is the work of the printer and their typesetter. Typesetting of the other parts, the front matter, and pages of the body matter involving specific design of their layout are, if budget permits, the remit of the book designer.

Typesetting of the body text is generally considered to be rote work: skilled, but not inherently creative. Computer typesetting was thus first applied to body text. This represented the bulk of the work, yet also that part requiring the least human creative input.

=== Styles ===
Body text is usually typeset in a serif font, as these are perceived as more readable for text in dense blocks, whilst a sans-serif font is used for the adjacent headings.

== Web design ==
HTML follows the 'book designer's' meaning of body text. There is an HTML element named <body> that serves to delimit the body matter from the front matter (or in HTML, the <head>) that contains metadata such as the page title. The typesetting of the web page is carried out by document body elements within this.

There is no specific HTML element for 'body text' in the typesetting sense. The block elements of <p> and <div> are both used for this, but these elements are used for a great many general markup purposes within HTML and so there is not usually any semantic implication that they always contain 'body'. <p> would generally be favoured over <div>.
