= Kiki Rockwell =

New Zealand singer (born 1995)

- Born: Maria Joaquina Keim Rockwell; 3 July 1995 (age 31); San Francisco, California, U.S.
- Origin: Auckland, New Zealand
- Genres: Folk rock; folk pop; art pop
- Instruments: Vocals; piano; percussion
- Years active: 2019–present
- Label: Chaos Knight
- Formerly of: The Leers
- Website: kikirockwell.com

Maria Joaquina Keim Rockwell (born 3 July 1995), better known as Kiki Rockwell, is a New Zealand singer-songwriter and producer. She (Note: Rockwell uses she/they pronouns.) was a member of The Leers before releasing her debut single "Left for Dead" and EP Bleeding Out in a Forest (both 2021). She has since released three albums and gained prominence through the single "Burn Your Village" (2023).

== Early life ==
Rockwell was born to a German mother in San Francisco, California, spent her early childhood in Bonn, Germany and primarily grew up in Auckland, New Zealand. Her mother is a therapist.

Rockwell played piano as a child and wrote a few songs in her youth, inspired by German fairy tales, the classics and folklore. In 2021, she cited FKA Twigs as an inspiration, and later, the Greek mythological figures Circe and Persephone.

== Career ==
In 2019, Rockwell composed her first song, after a breakup, and learned how to use GarageBand. In late 2020, she joined the New Zealand band The Leers, as keyboardist, percussionist and vocalist. She was featured on their EP The Only Way Out Is In.

Rockwell began her solo career in 2021. Her first single, "Left For Dead", was released in October 2021. The music video, which she directed herself, features a fantasy universe, inspired by the Wild West and dystopian video games. Her debut EP Bleeding Out In A Forest was released in November 2021. The standout single from this EP "Same Old Energy", described as feminist, deals with witchcraft and the history of witch hunts, with Rockwell expressing her wish to pay tribute to the victims of those events.

This was followed by the singles "Cup Runneth Over" and "Madeline" in 2022. "Cup Runneth Over" features a queer love story in a medieval setting.

Rockwell's debut album, Rituals on the Bank of a Familiar River was released in June 2023. She released her first German-language single "Tief Im Wald" as well as "From Persephone", "Harbinger" and "Burn Your Village". She collaborated with Judith de Lotharingie on "Arrow to the Knee".

Rockwell's second album Eldest Daughter of an Eldest Daughter was released in 2024. Singles included "Syrena" and "Strange Premonition". The album mixes folk, electro, indie pop and neo-classical. Among the themes she explores are witches, female rage and feminism, as well as European mythologies.

In 2026, Rockwell embarked on a headline tour supported by fellow New Zealand musician Finnegan Tui. Rockwell released the singles "Vampyr", "Faery Queen", and "Selkie" in August 2026. Her third album Plagued by Visions was released on 22 September and consists of 14 tracks.

== Discography ==
=== Albums ===
- Rituals on the Bank of a Familiar River (2023)
- Eldest Daughter of an Eldest Daughter (2024)
- Plagued by Visions (2026)

=== EPs ===
- Bleeding Out in a Forest (2021)

=== Singles ===
- "Left for Dead" (2021)
- "Same Old Energy" (2021)
- "Cup Runneth Over" (2022)
- "Madeline" (2022)
- "From Persephone" (2023)
- "Harbinger" (2023)
- "Burn Your Village" (2023)
- "Tief Im Wald" (2023)
- "Arrow to the Knee" (2023) feat Judith de Lotharingie
- "Syrena" (2024)
- "Strange Premonition" (2024)
- "Vampyr" (2026)
- "Faery Queen" (2026)
- "Selkie" (2026)
- "The Hunger" (2026)

=== Music videos ===
Year	Title	Director
2021	"Left for Dead"	Andrew Blackman
2021	"Same Old Energy"	Oshara Ardelean
2022	"Cup Runneth Over"	Oshara Ardelean
2022	"Madeline"	The Opposition Party (animation)
2023	"From Persephone"	Kiki Rockwell
2023	"Harbinger"	Kiki Rockwell
2023	"Burn Your Village"	Kiki Rockwell and Oshara Ardelean
2023	"Hejo, Spann Den Wagen An"	
2023	"Rise Up O Flame"	Oshara Ardelean
2023	"Tief Im Wald"	Kiki Rockwell and Louie Preshner
2023	"Arrow to the Knee"	Liam van den Berk
2024	"Syrena"	Oshara Ardelean
2024	"Strange Premonition"	Oshara Ardelean
2024	"Seven Angels Greet Me in the Carpark"	Kiki Rockwell and Jase Hancox
2024	"Dragonrider"	Kiki Rockwell
2025	"Faery King"	Oshara Ardelean
2026	"Vampyr"	Oscar Keys
2026	"Faery Queen"	Oshara Ardelean
2026	"Selkie"	Oscar Keys
2026	"The Hunger"	Kiki Rockwell and Ben Williams
