= Victoria Rockwell =

American mechanical engineer

Victoria A. Rockwell is an American mechanical engineer and engineering executive, the former president of the American Society of Mechanical Engineers (ASME), and former chair of the American Association of Engineering Societies.

Rockwell became interested in STEM in fourth grade through reading a book on astronomy and constellations. She studied applied science and mathematics at Empire State College, graduating with a bachelor's degree in 1976. She earned a second bachelor's degree in mechanical engineering from Union College in 1978. After working for Hoechst Celanese and Union Carbide, she joined Air Liquide in 1996, eventually becoming director of investment development for Air Liquide USA.

Rockwell was named as an ASME Fellow in 1999. She was president of the ASME for the 2011–2012 term. As president she pushed for ASME to encourage stem educators and women in STEM fields, and commissioned a task force on nuclear safety in response to the Fukushima nuclear accident. In 2012 Union College named her as one of their outstanding engineering alumni.
