= Rockwell Lake =

Lake in the state of Minnesota, United States

- Location within Minnesota
- Location: Hubbard County, Minnesota
- Coordinates: 46°56′36″N 94°59′39″W
- Type: lake

Rockwell Lake is a lake in Hubbard County, in the U.S. state of Minnesota.

Rockwell Lake was named for Charles H. Rockwell, a pioneer who settled near its banks.

== See also ==
- List of lakes in Minnesota
