= Rockwell (given name) =

Rockwell is a masculine given name borne by:

- Rockwell Blake (born 1951), American operatic tenor
- Rockwell J. Flint (1842–1933), American newspaper editor and politician
- Rockwell D. Hunt (1868–1966), American historian, professor and dean of the graduate school of the University of Southern California
- Rockwell Kent (1882–1971), American painter, printmaker, illustrator, writer, political activist, sailor, adventurer and voyager
- Rockwell A. Schnabel (born 1936), American businessman and diplomat
