= Centaur (typeface) =

- Category: Serif
- Classification: Old-style, Venetian
- Designers: Bruce Rogers; Frederic Warde; Nicolas Jenson; Ludovico Vicentino degli Arrighi
- Foundry: Monotype Corporation
- Date created: 1914
- Date released: 1929
- Also known as: Metropolitan

Centaur is a serif typeface by book and typeface designer Bruce Rogers, based on the Renaissance-period printing of Nicolas Jenson around 1470. He used it for his design of the Oxford Lectern Bible. It was given widespread release by the British branch of Monotype, paired with an italic designed by calligrapher Frederic Warde and based on the slightly later work of calligrapher and printer Ludovico Vicentino degli Arrighi. The italic has sometimes been named separately as the "Arrighi" italic.

Centaur is an elegant and quite slender design, lighter on the page than Jenson's work and most other revivals, an effect possibly amplified in the digital release compared to the metal type. It has been popular in fine book printing and is often used both for printing body text and especially titles and headings. One of its most notable uses has been in the designs of Penguin Books, who have regularly used it for titling.

== Historical background ==
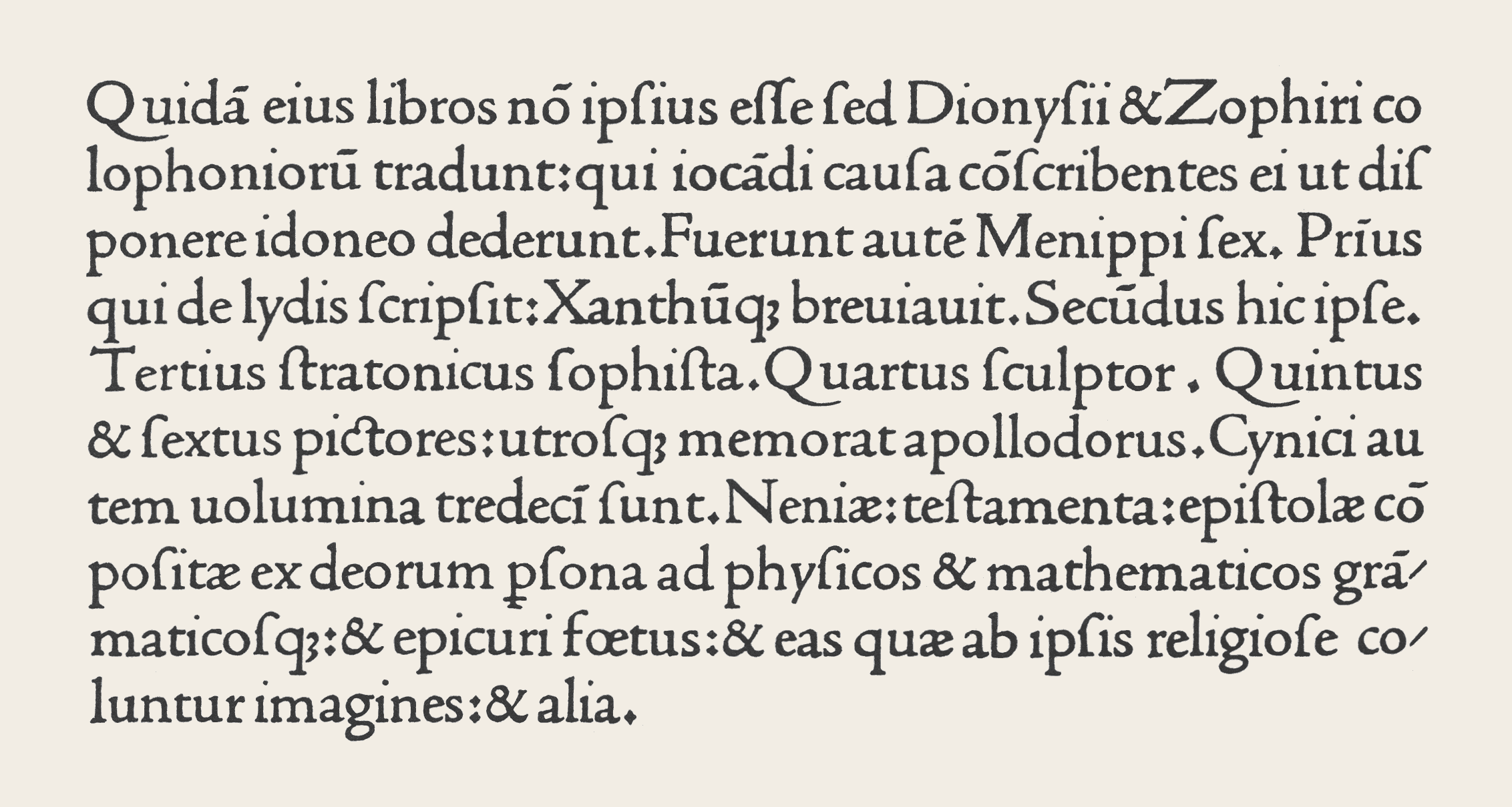
Jenson's roman type, from a 1475 edition.

Rogers' primary influence was Nicholas Jenson's 1470 Eusebius, considered the model for the modern upright printing of the Roman alphabet, which Rogers studied through enlarged photographs. (Note: Modern font designer Juliet Shen comments on Jenson's books that "A type designer looking at the Eusebius font is struck at once by how difficult it is to envision what the actual type looked like from its inked impression. Details are obscured: the stroke terminals and serifs are rounded from ink spread. So the first task of interpretation must be to decide what the skeletal form of each letter may have been before imper- fect printing added a layer of disguise.") Centaur also shows the influence of types cut by Francesco Griffo in 1495 for a small book titled De Aetna written by Pietro Bembo. The typeface is classified as belonging to the Venetian style of old-style designs, based on the predominant influence of Jenson's work. The style is also called Venetian for the city Jenson worked in during his career as a printer. In the late nineteenth century, Jenson's work had become a popular model for William Morris and then other fine printers of the Arts and Crafts movement. Morris commissioned a revival font copying Jenson's work, and several other revivals and imitations of Morris' work had followed by 1914.

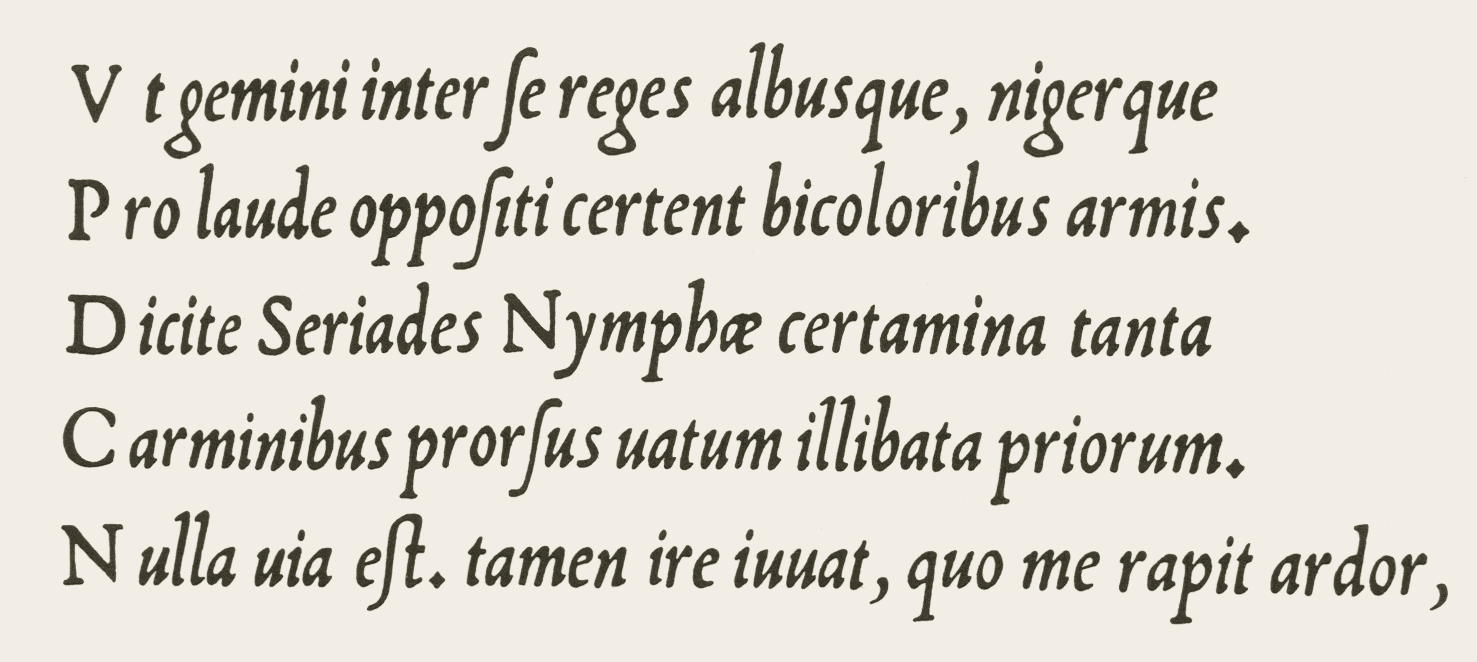
Arrighi's italic typeface design, ca. 1527. At the time italic capitals had not been invented, but were always upright in the Roman inscriptional tradition.

Italic typefaces did not exist in Jenson's time, and so the inspiration for Centaur's italic comes from thirty years later, in the calligraphy and printing of Ludovico Vicentino degli Arrighi. Arrighi was a Rome-based calligrapher who made the transition to working in printing, releasing a writing manual, La operina…, and other printed works. (Note: Arrighi's book had a complex publication history apparently involving a dispute between Arrighi and his publisher, making its dating and printing location(s) both somewhat involved. It is believed to have been published in Rome and Venice between 1522 and 1525.) These used an italic font presumably based on his calligraphy. It inspired later French italic types from 1528 onwards. (Note: Centaur's italic is one of several based on the work of Arrighi created by Monotype in the 1920s, including the italic Blado and Bembo Condensed Italic. Bembo's default italic is based on the work of Arrighi's contemporary Giovanni Antonio Tagliente, another calligrapher-turned-printer.)

== Revival ==
Rogers' revival was originally drawn as titling capitals in 1914 for the Metropolitan Museum of Art. Rogers later expanded it, adding lower case, for his 1915 limited edition of Maurice de Guérin's The Centaur.

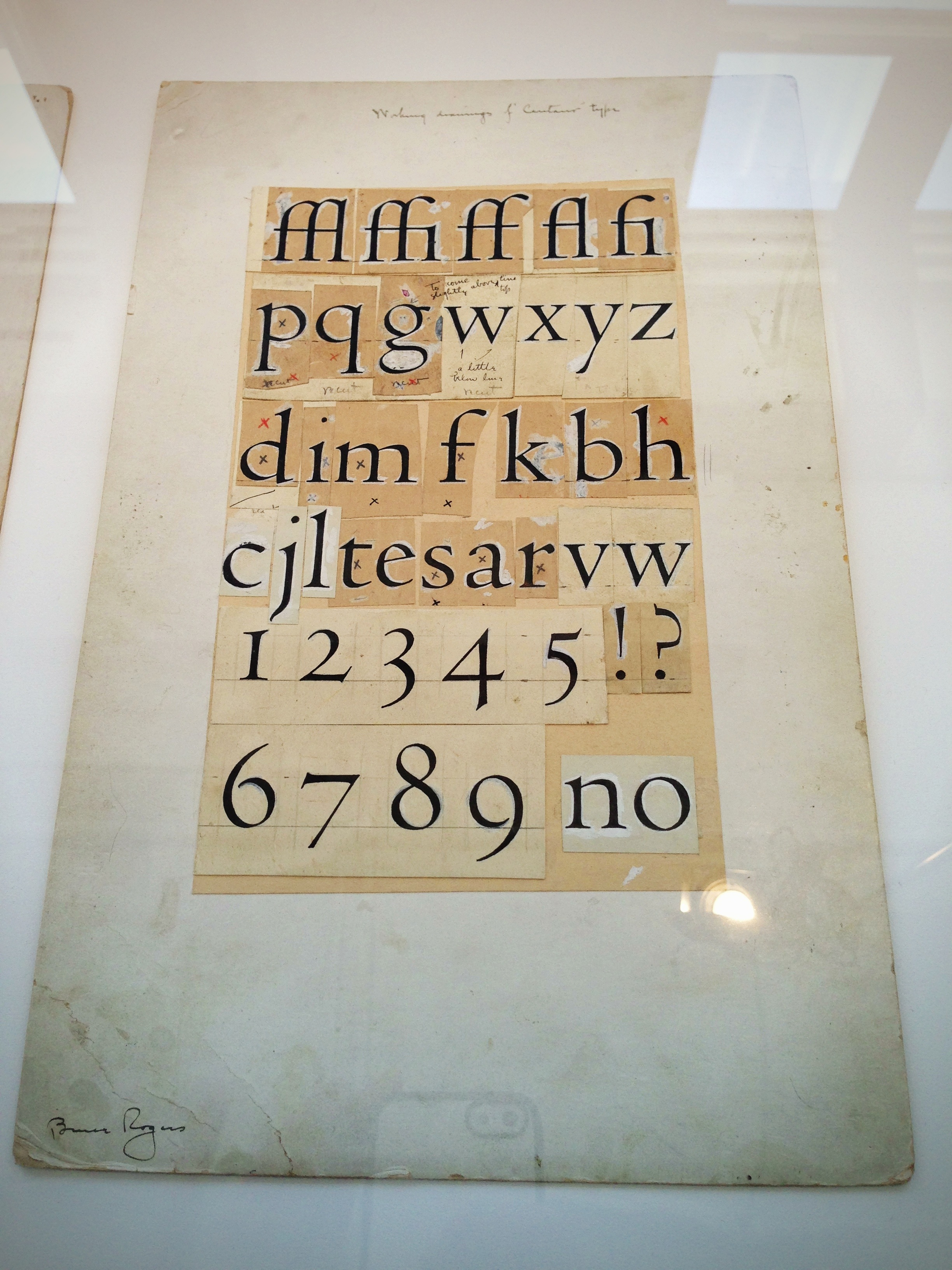
Rogers' original drawings

For the original release, matrices were cut by Robert Wiebking and the type was privately cast by American Type Founders. Some years later, the Monotype Corporation commissioned Rogers to release it for the general market. Rogers did not feel able to create a matching italic, and asked the calligrapher Frederic Warde if he could pair Centaur with a design Warde had created based upon Ludovico Arrighi’s 1520 chancery face, made in 1926 for the Officina Bodoni. Warde's design had the separate name Arrighi, which appears in some earlier specimens.

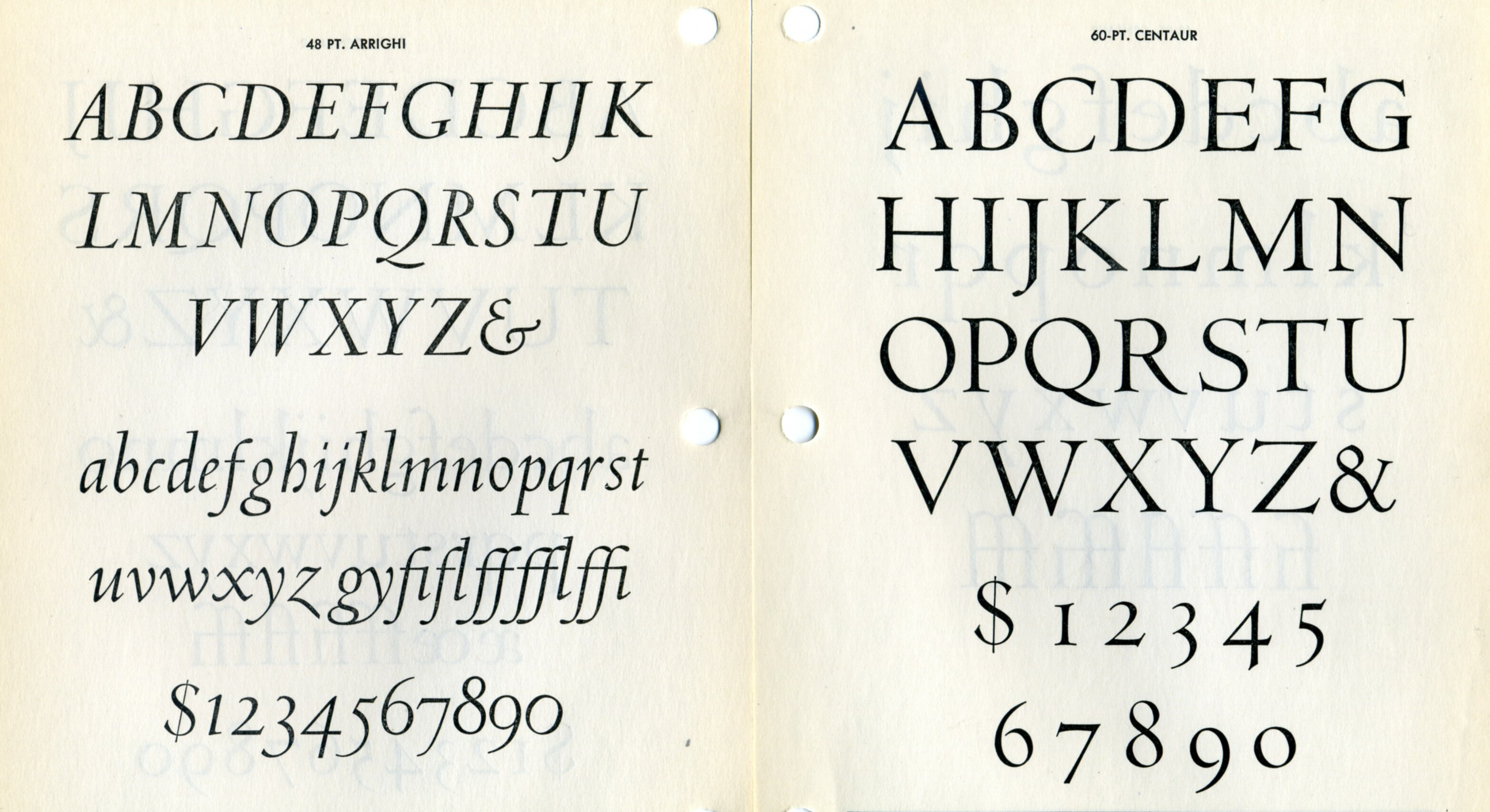
Centaur & Arrighi identified separately on a metal type specimen book, at large print size

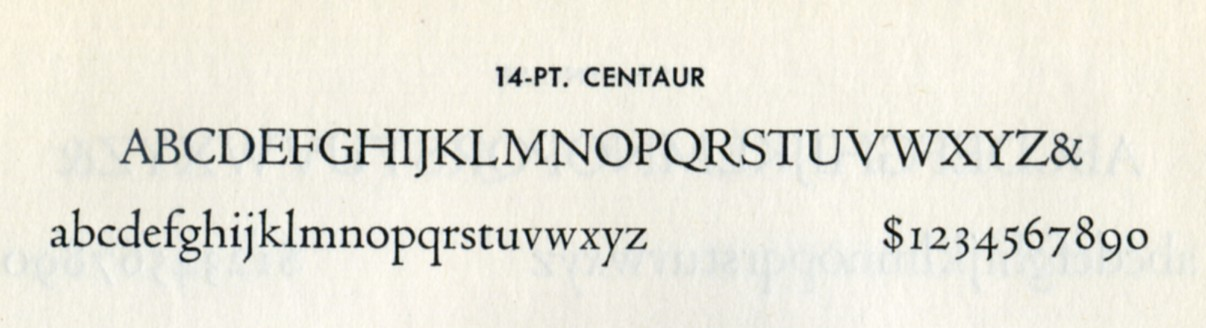

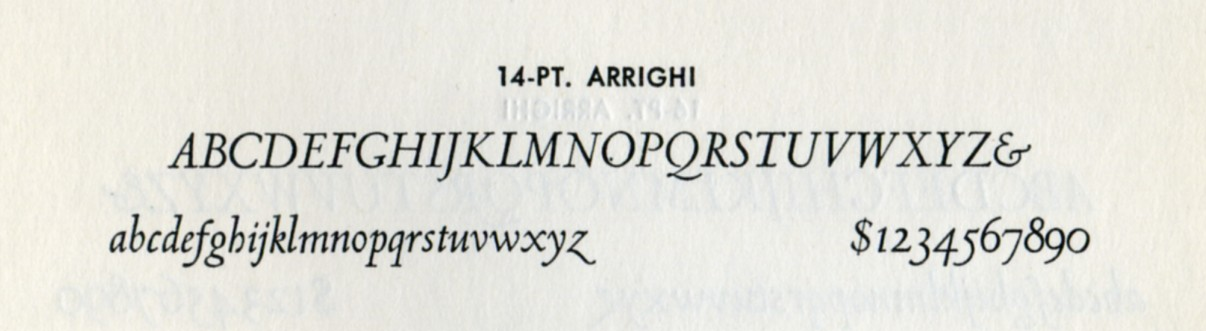
Centaur & Arrighi at text size

The completed family was released for general use in 1929, with a first showing in Monotype's specimen booklet The Trained Printer and the Amateur by Alfred W. Pollard. Monotype described it as a 'long-descender type of great distinction', emphasising its feeling of not having been restricted to allow tighter linespacing, as other types often had been in the hot metal period. Monotype has sold the design with bold and bold italic designs (their invention, since bold type did not exist until long after Jenson's and Arrighi's work), and swash italic alternate characters.

Centaur shows some of the irregularities of early type compared to later designs. The dots of the i and j are very visibly shifted to the right, a feature of Jenson's original design. The horizontal stroke of the 'e' is slanted, not exactly horizontal as came to be the norm in print. On the other hand, while based on study of Jenson's work, Centaur is a deliberately loose imitation, more slender (especially in the serifs) than Jenson's original. It also modernises Jenson's two-way serifs on the top of the 'M' in favour of one-way serifs. In addition, the italic capitals slope in the modern tradition, which was established after Arrighi's time in the later 16th century. Monotype advisor and historian of printing Stanley Morison, who was influential in Monotype's series of revival designs of the 1920s and 30s, described Centaur in his book A Tally of Types as "a freehand emphasis of the calligraphic basis of the original" and its modernisation "a concession to contemporary sense". Sebastian Carter calls it "an imaginative recreation".

=== Digitisations ===
Centaur has been digitised, both by Monotype in collaboration with Adobe, and by LTC, who assumed the rights to many Lanston (American) Monotype typefaces, under the name of Metropolitan. The revivals have slightly different features; Monotype’s having a bold and bold italic and swash caps and LTC’s having a more complex, less smooth digitisation with many italic alternates and complementary ornaments.

At least two open-source digital typefaces, Museum (by Raph Levien) and Coelacanth, are based on Centaur.

== Related fonts ==
Other Monotype fonts of the hot metal period inspired by Renaissance printing included the very popular Bembo (with a roman based on a slightly later font used by Aldus Manutius), Lutetia by Jan van Krimpen (a more personal design, as opposed to a direct revival) and the post-war Dante.

Among other Venetian revivals, Adobe Jenson is a notable and extremely complete digital revival from 1996 with features such as optical size fonts for different text sizes. William Morris's Golden Type began revivals of the Jenson style in 1892 with a more solid structure (no matching italic was created for it); other Jenson interpretations included the Doves Type while ATF's Satanick was a direct imitation of it. American Type Founders' Cloister Old Style was created by its design team led by Morris Fuller Benton around 1915, during the same period as Centaur. Ludlow created another release with italic under the direction of Ernst F. Detterer and Robert Hunter Middleton in the 1920s. American Type Founders also issued a very eccentric Jenson revival inspired by the work of Morris which is little-known today. Tobias Frere-Jones created a revival in 1994 named Hightower Text that is bundled with some Microsoft software, adding his own italic design.

== Usage ==
Outside its common uses, Centaur is also used for the wordmark of John Varvatos and in the children's book Crispin: The Cross of Lead, set in the Middle Ages.
