= Frederic Warde =

- Born: Arthur Frederic Ward; July 29, 1894; Wells, Minnesota
- Died: July 31, 1939 (aged 45); Manhattan, New York
- Known for: Typographer
- Notable work: Arrighi
- Spouse: Beatrice Warde
- Patrons: William Edwin Rudge, Stanley Morison

Frederic Warde (July 29, 1894 – July 31, 1939) was a book designer, editor, and typography designer. One of the great book designers of the twentieth century, Will Ransom described him as "a curious blend of romantic idealism and meticulous practicality." In describing his own work, Warde stated, "The innermost soul of any literary creation can never be seen in all its clarity and truth until one views it through the medium of the printed page, in which there must be absolutely nothing to divide the attention, interrupt the thought, or to offend one's sense of form."

== Biography ==
He was born Arthur Frederick Ward on July 29, 1894, in Wells, Minnesota, and changed his name to Frederic Warde in 1926.

In 1915 he enlisted in the United States Army, and attended the Army School of Military Aeronautics at the University of California, Berkeley during 1917-1918. He was a flying cadet.

On demobilisation in 1919 he worked as a book editor for Macmillan & Co, before undergoing training on the Monotype machine, after which he worked for the printers William Edwin Rudge from 1920 to 1922 under Bruce Rogers. From 1922 to 1924 Warde was Printer for Princeton University.

He had met Beatrice Becker in 1919, and they married in 1924 and left for Europe to study typography. Once in England, they met Charles Hobson of the Cloister Press in Manchester, and through him Stanley Morison, who offered Warde work designing and writing for The Fleuron and the Monotype Recorder. The marriage to Beatrice did not last, however, the couple separated in 1926, and soon divorced, though the break-up was an amicable one.

Afterwards Warde lived in France and Italy, where he became involved in Giovanni Mardersteig’s Officina Bodoni. Warde designed a revival of the chancery cursive letter forms of Renaissance calligrapher Ludovico degli Arrighi. This italic, titled Arrighi, was later used as a companion to Bruce Rogers' roman typeface Centaur. In 1926 Mardersteig printed The Calligraphic Manual of Ludovico Arrighi - complete Facsimile, with an introduction by Stanley Morison, which Warde issued in Paris while working for the Pleiad Press.

Warde returned to America permanently, and he worked again for William Edwin Rudge from 1927 to 1932. He also designed for private presses such as Crosby Gaige, the Watch Hill Press, Bowling Green Press, the Limited Editions Club and Heritage Press. From 1932 onwards, Warde published "The Dolphin, a Journal of the Making of Books, issued in book form by the Limited Editions Club of New York City. After the drastic contraction of fine-bookmaking with the onset of the depression, Warde turned to commercial work, first with the Morrill Press, then as a partner in McFarlane, Warde, McCarlane, finally becoming production manager for the American office of the Oxford University Press from 1937.

Warde died in Manhattan, New York on July 31, 1939.

== Typefaces ==
Though thought of as an italic, Warde’s one and only typeface, Arrighi, is actually a chancery, or script typeface, which imitates the handwriting of the fifteenth century. Warde made three distinct cuttings of the face:

- Arrighi (1926) with punches made by Charles Malin and used by Officina Bodoni. There were no capitals in this font, nor were there serifs on the ascenders.
- Vicenza a re-cutting with serifs on the ascenders and also used by Officina Bodoni.
- Arrighi (1929) was commissioned by Bruce Rogers to be an italic complement to his Centaur. This font had capital letters and was later issued for commercial use by Lanston Monotype. It is worth noting that this is not the first usage of a chancery type to accompany a Humanist Old Style type face, as Blado had been used to accompany Bembo in 1929.

== Publications ==
- "Bruce Rogers, Designer of Books," New York City, 1926
- "Printers Ornaments on the Monotype," Monotype Corporation, Philadelphia, 1928.
