= Golden Type =

Typeface designed by William Morris

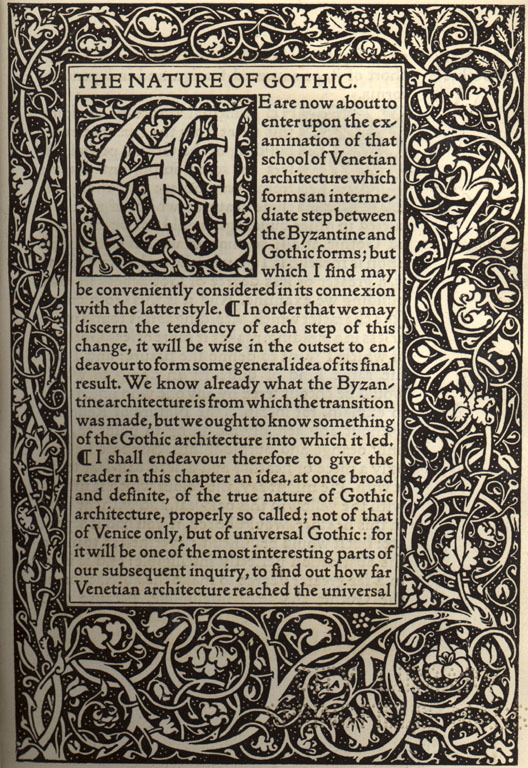
The Golden Type used in a printing of The Nature of Gothic by John Ruskin.

The Golden Type is a serif typeface designed by artist William Morris for his fine book printing project, the Kelmscott Press, in 1890. It is an "old-style" serif face, based on type designed by engraver and printer Nicolas Jenson in Venice around 1470. It is named for the Golden Legend, which was intended to be the first book printed using it. The original design has neither an italic nor a bold weight, as neither of these existed in Jenson's time.

Morris's aim in the Kelmscott Press was to revive the style of early printing and medieval manuscripts, and the design accordingly is a profound rejection of the harsh, industrial aesthetic of the contemporary Didone typefaces used at the time in general-purpose printing, and also of the relatively pallid "modernised old style" designs popular in books. Instead, the design has a relatively heavy "colour" on the page. The design is a loose revival, somewhat bolder than Jenson's original engraving, giving it something of the appearance of medieval blackletter writing, and it has been criticised for ponderousness due to this heavy appearance. (A particularly extreme response in the twentieth century was that of Stanley Morison, who while polite about its innovation and legibility described its design privately as "positively foul".) Morris decided not to use the long s and some ligatures found in early printing but discarded since, feeling that they made texts hard to read.

To prepare the design, Morris commissioned enlarged photographs of Jenson's books from the artist Emery Walker (which survive), from which he prepared drawings; Walker was interested in the history of printing and his interest may have inspired Morris to venture into printing. The design was then cut into metal in a single size by Edward Prince and cast by the company of Morris's friend Talbot Baines Reed.

The Golden Type sparked a trend of other typefaces in a similar style commissioned for fine book printing in Britain, including that of the Doves Press, which was co-founded by Walker. Several of these typefaces were also cut by Prince. Other early copies were made in America. Many similar Jenson revivals, including Cloister Old Style, the Doves Type, Centaur, Adobe Jenson and Hightower Text have been created since, most more faithful to Jenson's original work. It also influenced some of the work of Frederic Goudy.

The Golden Type has been digitised by ITC. The original punches and matrices, along with all of Morris's other typefaces, survive in the collection of Cambridge University Press.

== Gallery ==
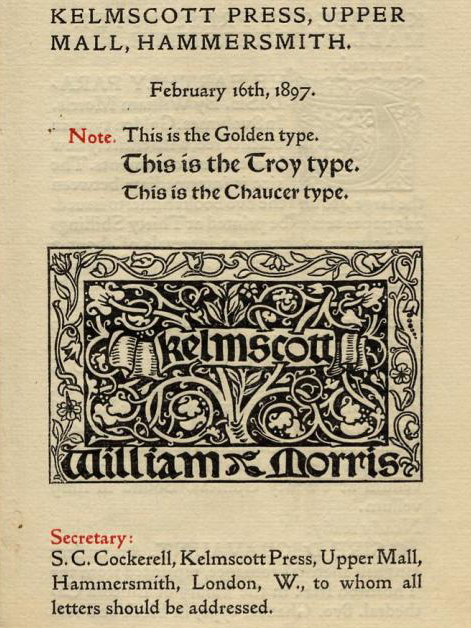
The Golden Type among other typefaces used by the Kelmscott Press

ITC Golden Type typeface name as a specimen
