= Oxford Lectern Bible =

The Oxford Lectern Bible was a massive edition of the English Bible designed by American typographer Bruce Rogers using his font Centaur. The Bible, completed in 1935, was published by Oxford University Press. There were three sizes of the Bible printed. From the booklet An Account of the making of the Oxford Lectern Bible by Bruce Rogers, "...for the size of the leaf, I now learned for the first time, must not exceed the standard dimensions of the folio Bibles used on the brass lecterns of most English churches — and this size was 12 x 16 inches. ... So I proposed to Mr. Milford that he have fifty copies printed for me on larger paper, preferably a hand-made, to which he readily agreed; and eventually two hundred copies were printed on Batchelor's paper in this form, in addition to the printing of 1000 copies on the smaller paper made at the Wolvercote Mill."

According to the insert which comes with the booklet, in talking about the additional 200 copies, "The type page is 9 by 13 inches, printed on a leaf 13 by 18 1/4 inches. A volume of this size being inconvenient to handle except on a lectern, 200 copies intended for general distribution were divided into two volumes, duplicate title pages and suitable half-titles being supplied. ...".

The third size was the 19-1/4 by 14 inches for the unique copy in the Library of Congress according to the Arion Press.

It is considered by many to be Rogers' masterpiece, and is recognized along with the other great Bibles, including the Baskerville Bible and the Doves Press Bible. Several images can be seen on the page for The Oxford Lectern Bible at White Unicorn Books.
