= Ludovico Vicentino degli Arrighi =

Papal scribe and type designer

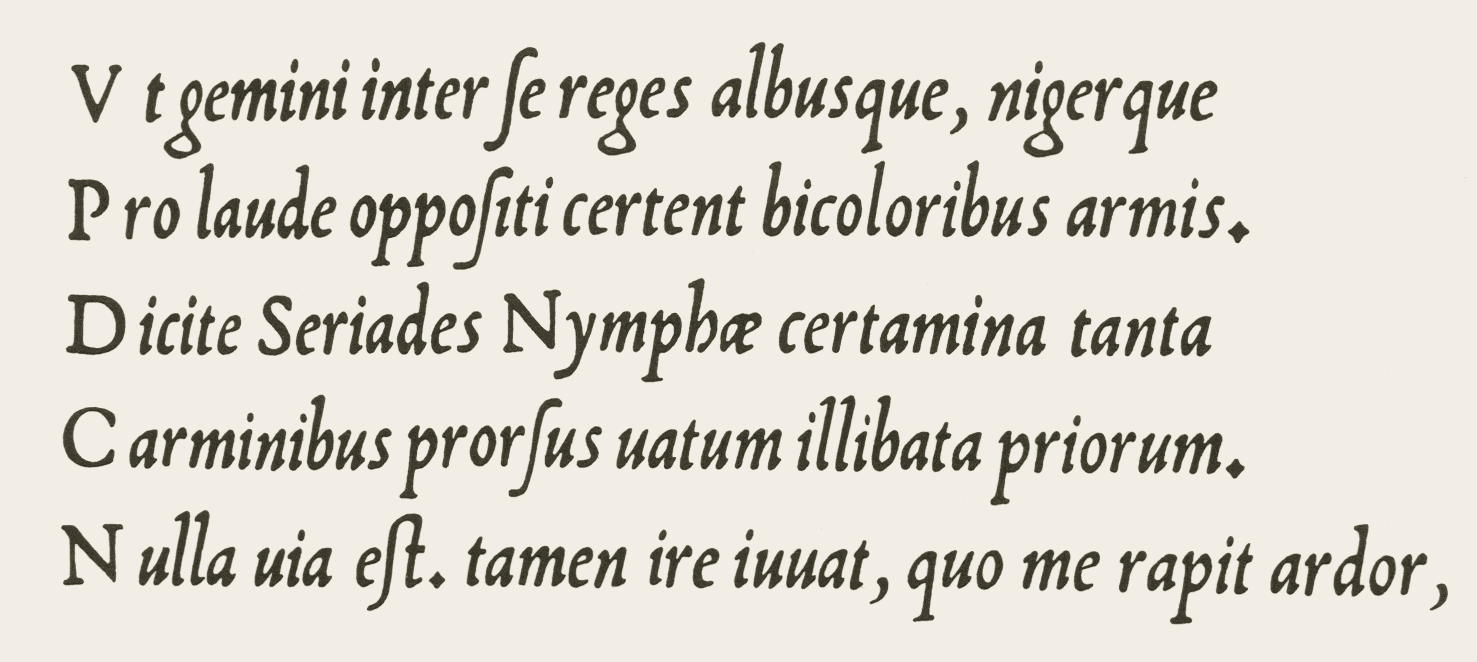
Arrighi's italic typeface design, c. 1523. The type is based on the Renaissance Italian handwritten script known as "cursiva humanistica". It inspired later French italic types.

Ludovico Vicentino degli Arrighi (1475?–1527?) was a papal scribe and type designer in Renaissance Italy.

Very little is known of the circumstances of his life. He was born in Cornedo Vicentino. He may have started his career as a writing master in Venice, although this has been disputed. Around 1510 he was a bookseller in Rome. He was employed as a scribe at the Apostolic Chancery in 1513. His experience in calligraphy led him to create an influential pamphlet on handwriting in 1522 called La Operina, which was the first book devoted to writing the italic script known as chancery cursive. This work, a 32-page woodblock printing, was the first of several such publications.

He turned to printing in 1524 and designed his own italic typefaces for his work, which were widely emulated. His last printing was dated shortly before the sack of Rome (1527), during which he was probably killed.

His letterforms were revived in the 20th century by designers such as Stanley Morison, Frederic Warde, Robert Slimbach (for example Adobe Jenson italic) and Jonathan Hoefler (in his Requiem Text typeface.) The italic script presented in La Operina was also revived in the 20th century with Alfred Fairbank's book A Handwriting Manual (1932), Getty-Dubay italic script, and the work of Gunnlaugur SE Briem.

== Works ==
- Regola da imparare scrivere varii caratteri de littere con li suoi compassi et misure (in Italian). Venezia: Niccolò Zoppino. 1533.
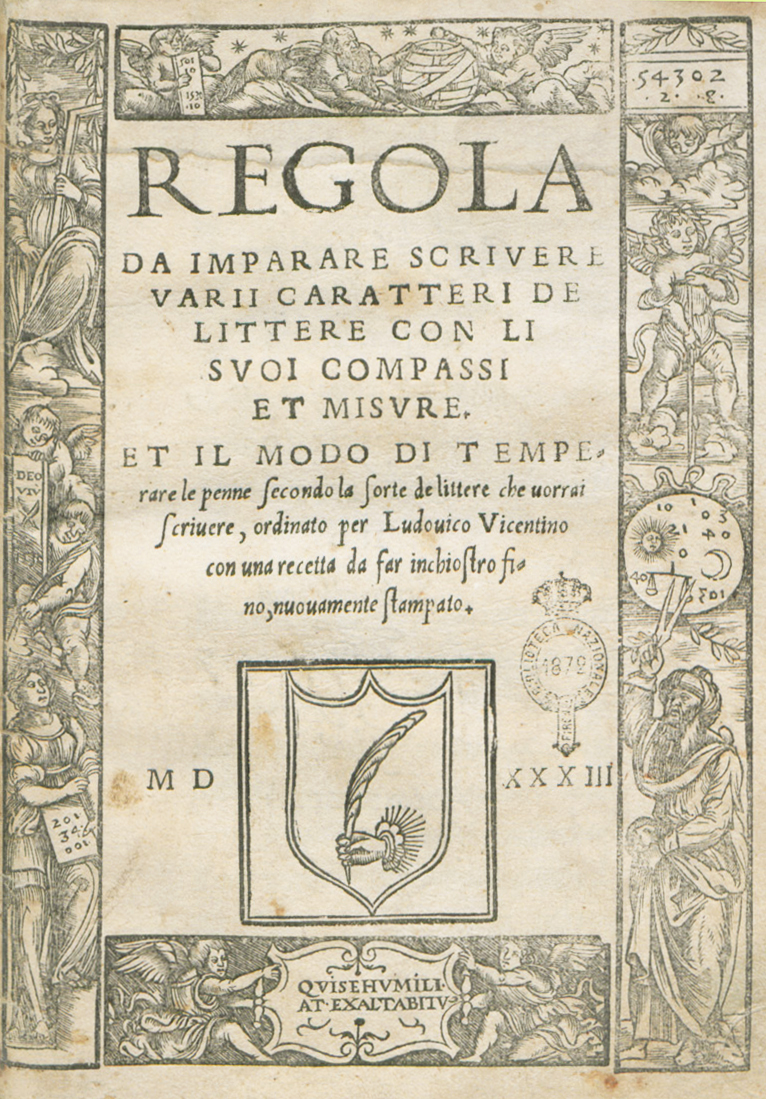
Regola da imparare scrivere varii caratteri de littere con li suoi compassi et misure, 1533

=== Arrigi's Manuscripts and Books as known around 1966 ===
==== Manuscripts ====
- Ludovico de Varthema, Itinerario, c. 1510, Bibliotheca Nazionale Centrale, Florence, Cod. Laudau Finaly 9
- Valerius Maximus, Factorum et dictorum memorabilium libri, 1515-16, (private owner at 1966: Frank Allan Thompson at Stockholm)
- Aristotle, Ethica, 1517, Universiteits Bibliotheek, Amsterdam
- Gian Giorgio Trissino, La Sophonisba, (fragmentary), British Museum (now British Library), Add MS 26873
- Book of Hours, Fitzwilliam Museum, Cambridge, MS. J. 156
- Pandolfo Collenuccio, Apologi and Lucian, Dialogi, translated into Latin by Livius Guidoloctus, c. 1520, British Museum (now British Library), Royal MS 12 C viii
- Two briefs, in Renaissance Handwriting, (Fairbank and Wolpe), pls. 16 & 17, (Attributed by Alfred Fairbank)
- Missale Romanum, Kupferstichkabinett Berlin, 78 D 17
- Cicero, Letter to Quintus, British Museum (now British Library), Add MS 11930
- List of benefactors of the Ospedale di San Giovanni in Laterano. Archivio di Stato, Rome, MS. 1010 (attributed by Wardrop)
- Niccolò Machiavelli, Clitia, c. 1515, Colchester and Essex Museum, England

==== Printed books, etc. ====
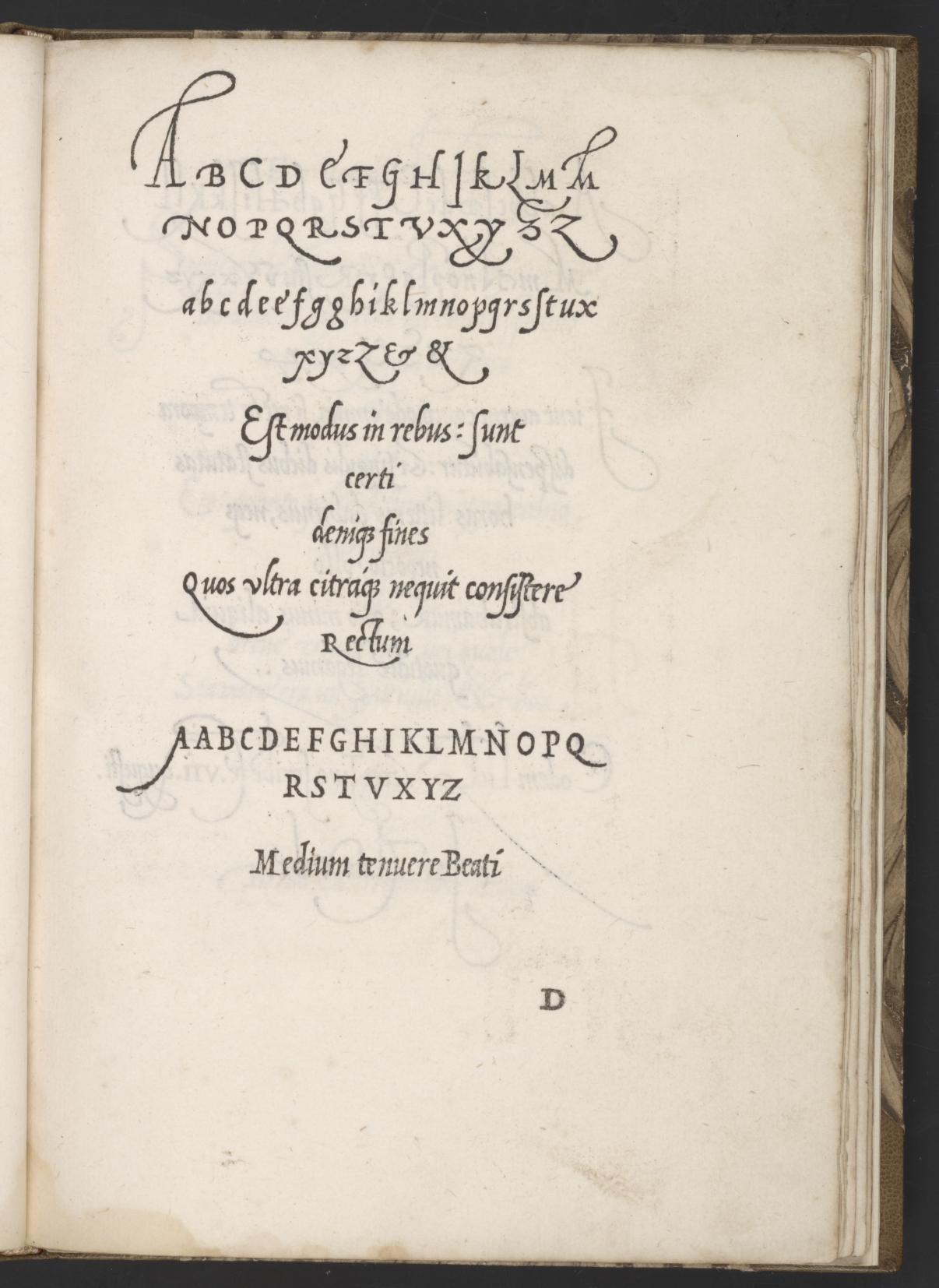
Page from La Operina, 1522. From the Rosenwald Collection, Library of Congress.

- Ludovico Vicentino, La Operina, 1522, (digitized version)

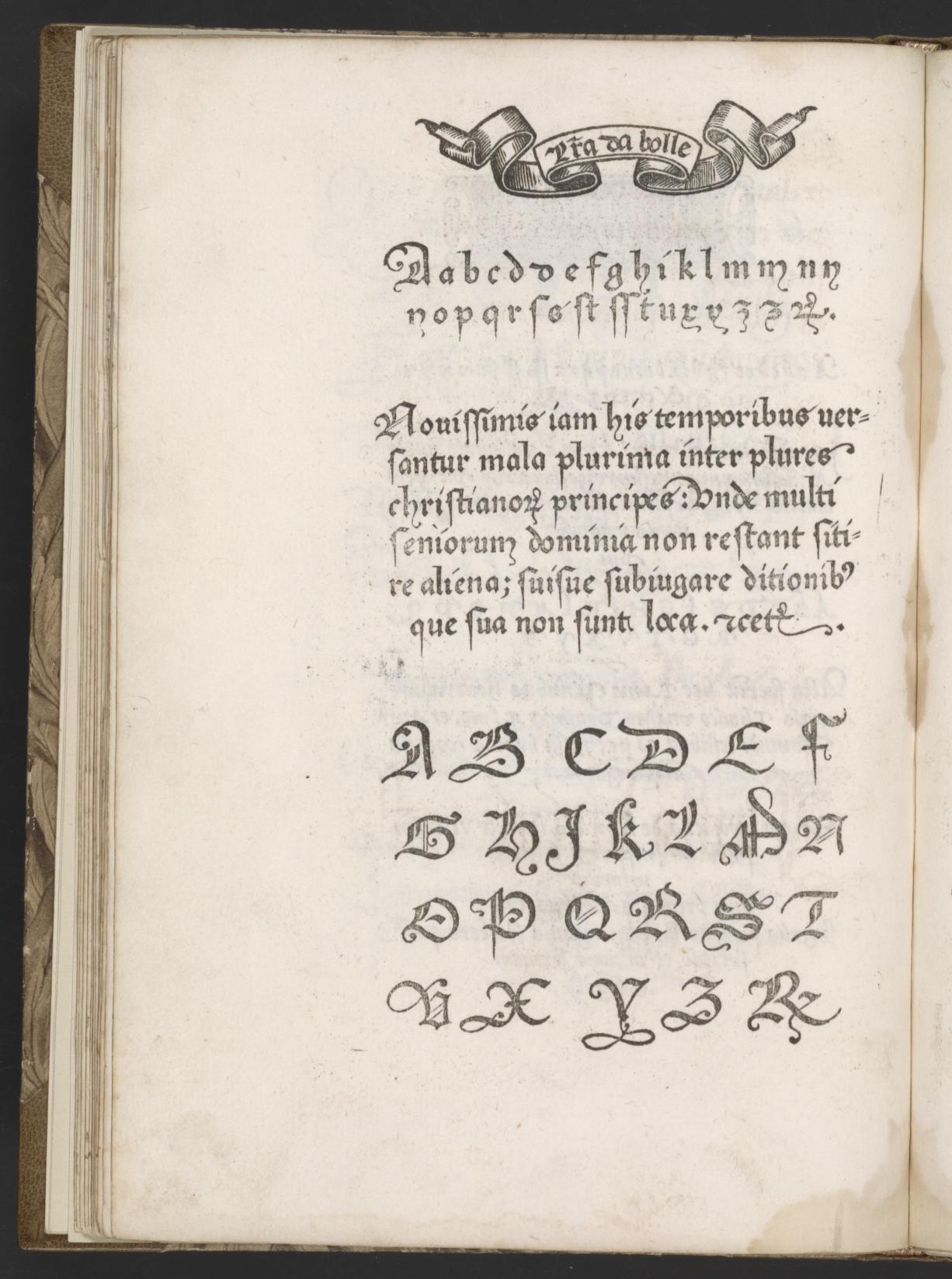
Page from Il Modo de Temperare le Penne, 1523. From the Rosenwald Collection, Library of Congress.

- Ludovico Vicentino, Il modo de temperare de Penne, 1523, (4 pages of type) Vincentino and Eustachio Celebrino
- Pope Clement VII, Bulla... contra homicidas, dated Prid. Idib. Junii 1524
- Blossio Palladio ed., Coryciana, (Latin poems in honour of Johann Goritz, Protonotary Apostolic), Vicentino and Lautizio, July 1524
- Gian Giorgio Trissino, La Sophonisha, Vicentino and Lautizio, July 1524
- Gian Giorgio Trissino, Rime del Trissino, Vicentino, September 1524
- Gian Giorgio Trissino, Oratione... al Serenissimo Principe di Venetia, Vicentino and Lautizio, October 1524
- Gian Giorgio Trissino, I ritratti , Vicentino and Lautizio, October 1524
- J. B. Fuscano, Al illustriss, S. don Loisi di Cordova duca di Sessa, etc. Vicentino and Lautizio, October 1524
- J. B. Fuscano, Al disertiss. cultor di Muse, M. Jano Vitale, etc, Vicentino and Lautizio, October 1524
- Pietro Aretino, Esortatione, de la pace tra l'Imperadore e il Re di Francia, Vicentino and Lautizio, 25 December 1524
- Agnolo Firenzuola, Discacciamento de le nuove lettere, etc., Vicentino and Lautizio, December 1524
- C. Silvanus Germanicus, In Pontificatum Clementis Septimi pont. max. panegyris, Vicentino and Lautizio, 12 December 1524
- Pope Clement VII, Monitorium contra clericos... super habitu et tonsura et aliis, 2 December 1924
- Gian Giorgio Trissino, Al Reveren. Mons. Giovan Mattheo Giberti etc, 1524
- Gian Giorgio Trissino, Epistola... de la vita che dee tenere una donna vedova, Vicentino and Lautizio, 1524
- Gian Giorgio Trissino, Canzone... al Santissimo Clemente settimo P.M., 1524
- Gian Giorgio Trissino, Epistola... de la lettere nuovamente aggiunte la lingua italiana, 1524
- B. Casalius, In legem agrarium... oratio, Vicentino and Lautizio, 1524
- G. Sauromanus, Ad Principes christiannos de religione ac communt concordia, 1524
- G. Vitale, Iani Vitalis Panhormitani... in pacem Hymnus, 1524-25
- Pietro Aretino, Canzone in laude del sig. Datario, Vicentino and Lautizio, 1525
- Claudio Tolomei, De le lettere nuovamente aggiunte, Libro di Adriano Franci de Siena, Intitolato il Polito, Vicentino and Lautizio, 1525
- Aliquot Declamatiunculae et Orationes e Graeco in Latiunum versae, Vicentino and Lautizio, 14 January 1525
- Z. Ferrerius, Hymni novi ecclesiastici Vicentino and Lautizio, 1525
- G. Melezio, Ioannis Meletii... tragica Elegia ad Itaiam et Galliam infelices, 28 Februari 1525
- P. Cursius, Poema de civitate Castellana Faliscorum, Vicentino and Lautizio, 29 March 1525
- G. Borgia, Ad Carolum Caesarem Opt. Max. Monarchia, 1 April 1525
- C. Marcellus, In Psalmum Usque Domine oblivisceris mei, Vicentino and Lautizio, 19 April 1525
- F. Cattani da Diacetto, Panegirico, 1926
- Pandolfo Collenuccio, Apologi IIII, Vicento, 1526
- Pandolfo Collenuccio, Specchio di Esopo, Vicento 1526
- Pope Julius III, Joannus Mariae Archipiscopi Sipontini ad Principes christinos oratio de pace, Viceento. 1526
- Itinerarium Philippi Bellucii, Vincento, 1526
- Pope Clement VII, Perpetuatio officiorum etiam Romanae Curiae and other works, Vicentino (dated 1525)
- M. F. Calvo, Antiquae urbis Romae cum regionibus simulachrum Vicentino, April 1527
- M. H. Vida, De arte poetica, etc., Vicentino, April 1527
- Pope Clement VII, Breve 'Cum nuper excercitus...' , dated 8 June 1527

== See also ==
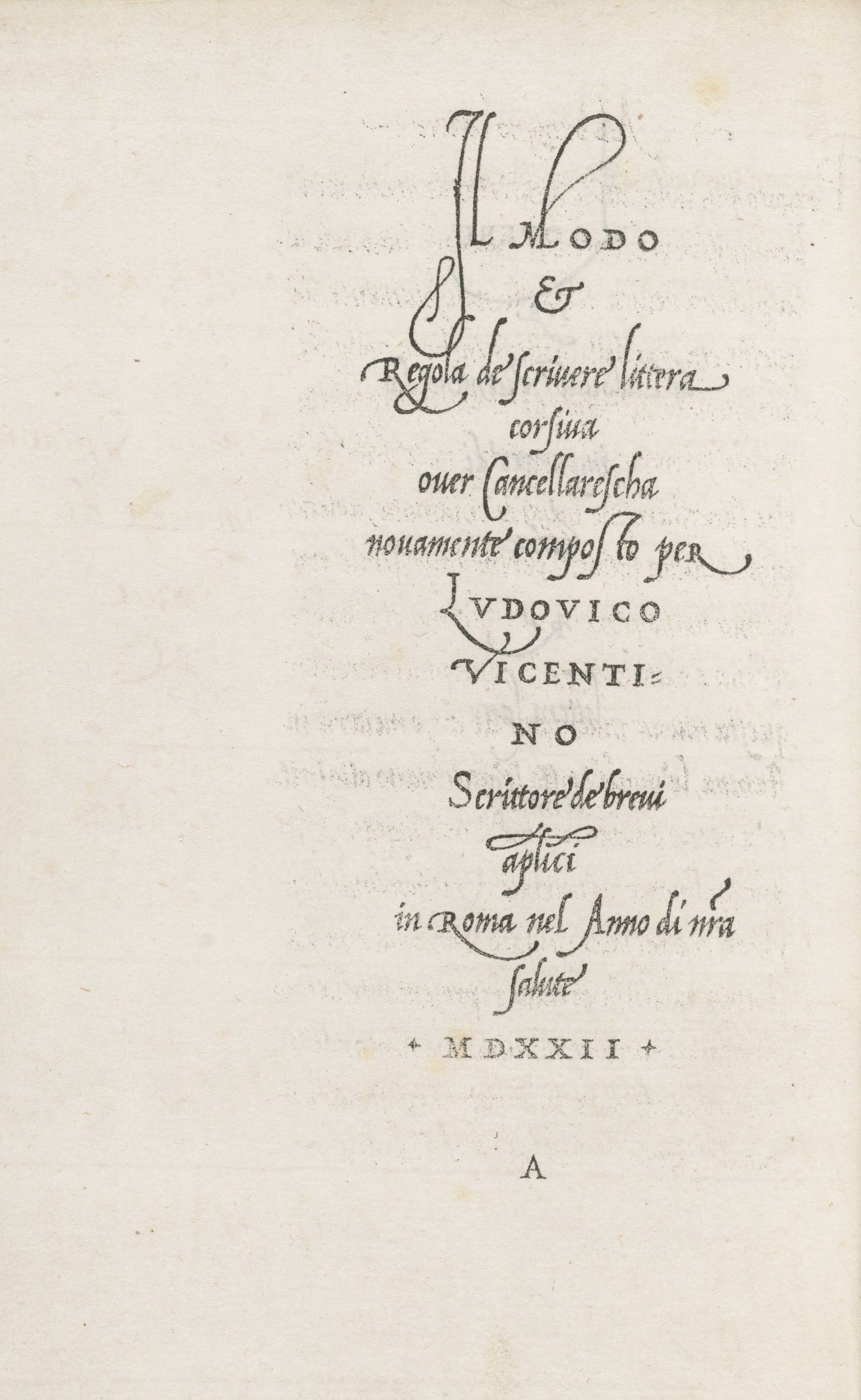
From La Operina, 1522

- Typeface
- History of typography
