= Bruce Rogers (typographer) =

American typographer

- Photo of Bruce Rogers
- Born: Albert Bruce Rogers; May 14, 1870; Lafayette, Indiana, United States
- Died: May 21, 1957 (aged 87); New Fairfield, Connecticut
- Other name: BR
- Known for: Typographer
- Notable work: Oxford Lectern Bible, Centaur typeface, bookplates
- Spouse: Anna Embree Baker

Bruce Rogers (May 14, 1870 – May 21, 1957) was an American typographer and type designer, acclaimed by some as among the greatest book designers of the twentieth century. Rogers was known for his "allusive" typography, rejecting modernism, seldom using asymmetrical arrangements, rarely using sans serif type faces, often favoring faces such as Bell (at the time known only as Brimmer), Caslon, his own Montaigne, a Jensonian precursor to his masterpiece of type design Centaur. His books can fetch high sums at auction.

== Early life ==
Born Albert Bruce Rogers in Linwood, now part of Lafayette, Indiana, he never used the name Albert and was known to associates as "BR." Rogers received a B.S. from Purdue University in 1890. He enrolled at age 16, and was quickly recognized in his studies of illustration, allowing him to work with University catalogs, lettering for the yearbook, and the College Quarterly Magazine. At Purdue, he worked with political cartoonist John T. McCutcheon on the student newspaper and yearbook.

After graduation, Rogers worked as both an artist for the Indianapolis News and as office boy for a railroad. After seeing several Kelmscott Press editions, Rogers became interested in producing fine books, and so moved to Boston, then a center of publishing, where he free-lanced for L. Prang and Co.

== Typographer and type designer ==
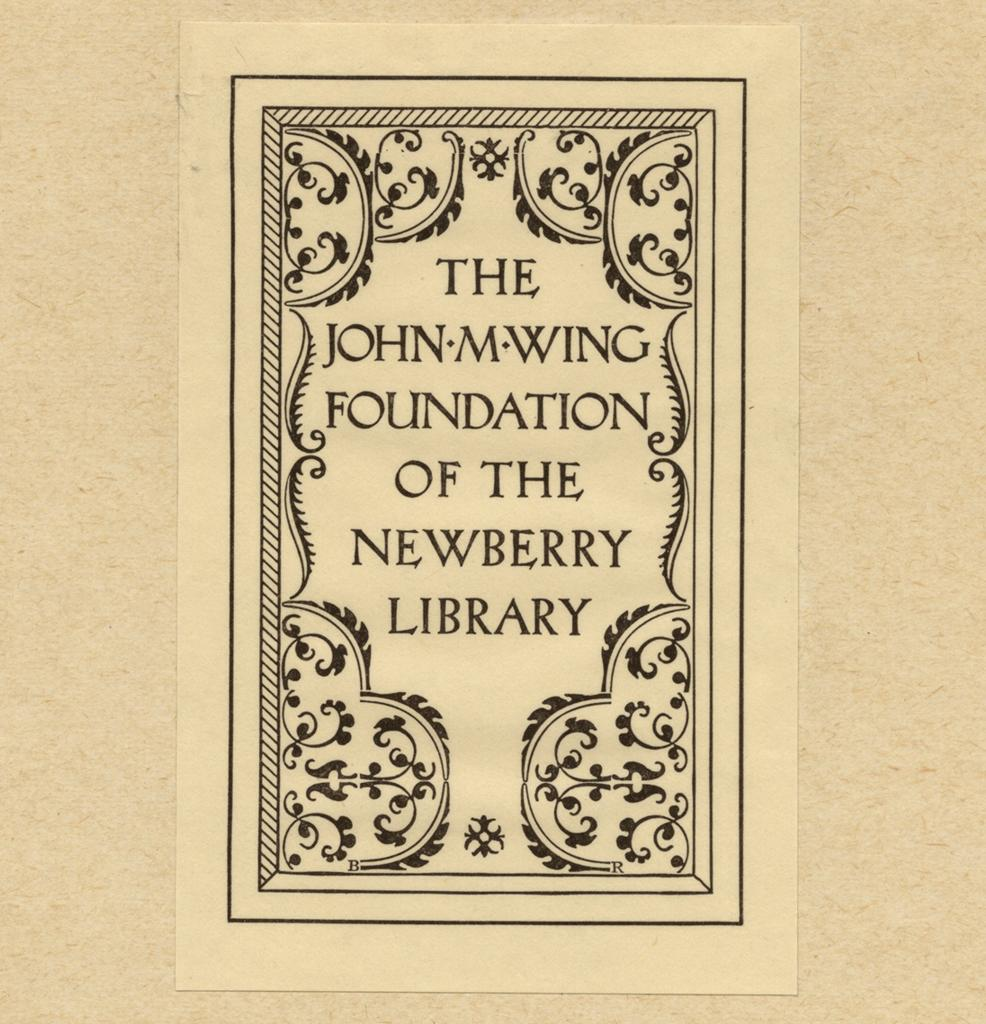
Rogers bookplate for the Newberry Library, featuring Rudolf Koch's Eve Bold typeface

=== Riverside Press period (1895–1911) ===
In 1895 he took a position designing books for Riverside Press in Cambridge, Massachusetts where he worked on trade books and designed book advertisements for the Atlantic Monthly. In 1900 a Department of Special Bookmaking for the production of fine editions was created with Mr. Rogers its head. More than sixty of these Riverside Press Editions were designed by Rogers, decorated with illustrations and ornament largely by him, and printed on handmade, damped paper. It was there, in 1901, that he cut his first typeface, Montaigne, a Venetian style face named for the first book it appeared in, a 1903 limited edition of The Essays of Montaigne.

=== New York/Dyke Mill period (1911–1916) ===
In 1912 Rogers moved to New York City, where he worked both as an independent designer and as house designer for the Metropolitan Museum of Art. It was for the Museum's 1915 limited edition of Maurice de Guérin's The Centaur that he designed his most famous type-face, Centaur. Like Montaigne it was based on the Venetian faces of Nicolas Jenson. Rogers considered this face to be an improvement on his earlier Montaigne, both because his design had matured and because, on the advice of Frederic Goudy, he had employed Robert Wiebking as the punch-cutter; and Rogers used Centaur extensively for the rest of his career The Centaur was produced by Rogers in Dyke Mill at Carl Purington Rollins' Montague Press (hand-set by his wife, Anne Rogers (1867–1931)), and it is now one of the most collected books ever printed.

=== First visit to Britain ===
In 1916 Rogers left for England to work with Emery Walker, hoping to establish a press for fine editions. However, because of wartime conditions, only one book was produced, and Rogers soon sought employment with the Cambridge University Press. He found conditions at the press to be poor, and his report to the syndics of the press resulted in many reforms and paved the way for the hiring of Stanley Morison as typographic adviser.

=== Mount Vernon period (1921–1928) ===
After returning to the U.S., Rogers met William Edwin Rudge, who began to use Rogers extensively as a book designer for his Mount Vernon Press. This was Rogers' most productive and remunerative period, as he worked three days a week designing books for Rudge, served as typographic adviser and designed books for Harvard University Press (from 1920 to 1936), served as typographic adviser to Lanston Monotype, and produced a few books for the June House Press, which he operated in partnership with James Raye Wells and James Hendrickson.

=== Second visit to Britain ===
In 1928 Rogers left for England in hopes of producing an edition of Homer's Odyssey translated by T. E. Lawrence. Despite Rogers's being very "bookish," he and the dashing 'Lawrence of Arabia' soon became close, lifelong friends. The project took four years and the fine book was printed in Centaur types, on gray handmade paper, bound in black Niger leather. Rogers also became engaged to produce the Oxford Lectern Bible for Oxford University Press. This project took six years, requiring annual trips to Oxford to oversee its completion in 1935. Joseph Blumenthal called this "The most important and notable typographic achievement of the twentieth century." To produce the Bible, an italic complement to Centaur was needed. As he did not feel capable of designing the sort of chancery face that he thought appropriate, Rogers chose to pair Centaur with Frederic Warde's Arrighi, a pairing retained to this day.

=== October House period (1932–1957) ===
In later years Rogers worked as a free-lancer, designed his World Bible, and wrote and designed his book on printing, Paragraphs on Printing, published by William E. Rudge's Sons in 1943.

== Personal life ==
In 1900 Rogers married Anna Embree Baker, and they remained together until her death in 1936. As Rogers spent most of his working life as a free-lancer, they lived frugally and were often in financial straits. Rogers purchased October House, his residence in New Fairfield, Connecticut, in 1925, and made this his permanent home from 1932 until his death. Rogers was a member of the Typophiles, and smoked imported English cigarettes.

== Death ==
Rogers died on May 18, 1957, in New Fairfield, Connecticut.

In later life Rogers and his wife Anne donated a substantial collection of books, early manuscripts, and antique furniture to Purdue University's Special Collection Library. The bulk of his papers are in the collection of the Beinecke Rare Book and Manuscript Library.

== Works ==
=== Sayings of Bruce Rogers ===
- "Don't borrow contemporary work — you are sure to be found out."
- "Never apologize."
- "The first requisite of all book design is orderliness."
- When told that something he had produced was not "according to Hoyle" he answered, "We're Hoyle.".

=== Typefaces ===
- Montaigne (1901, privately cast), punches cut by John Cumming
- Centaur (original) (1914, privately cast by Barnhart Brothers & Spindler), matrices cut by Robert Wiebking of the Western Type Foundry.
- Centaur (Monotype) (1929, Monotype Ltd. and Mackenzie & Harris), matrices re-cut for machine composition by British Monotype.

=== Bookplates ===
In addition to his work as a typographer and type designer, Rogers worked designing ephemera, such as bookplates. Bookplates by Rogers that have survived in library and museum collections show that his bookplate designs were text-based, only rarely including small images, and frequently showcased his type designs.

Bookplates designed by Bruce Rogers

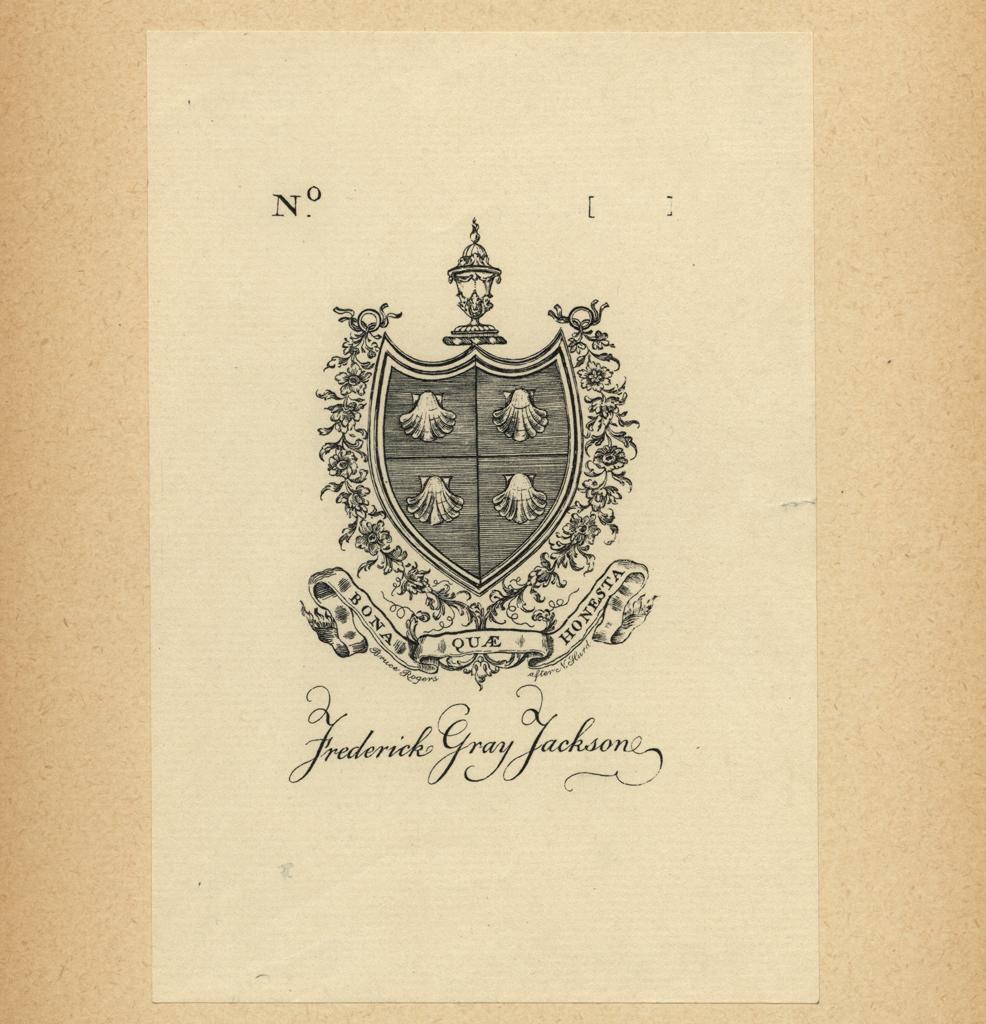
An early (1900) Bruce Rogers bookplate, lacking his usual block text.

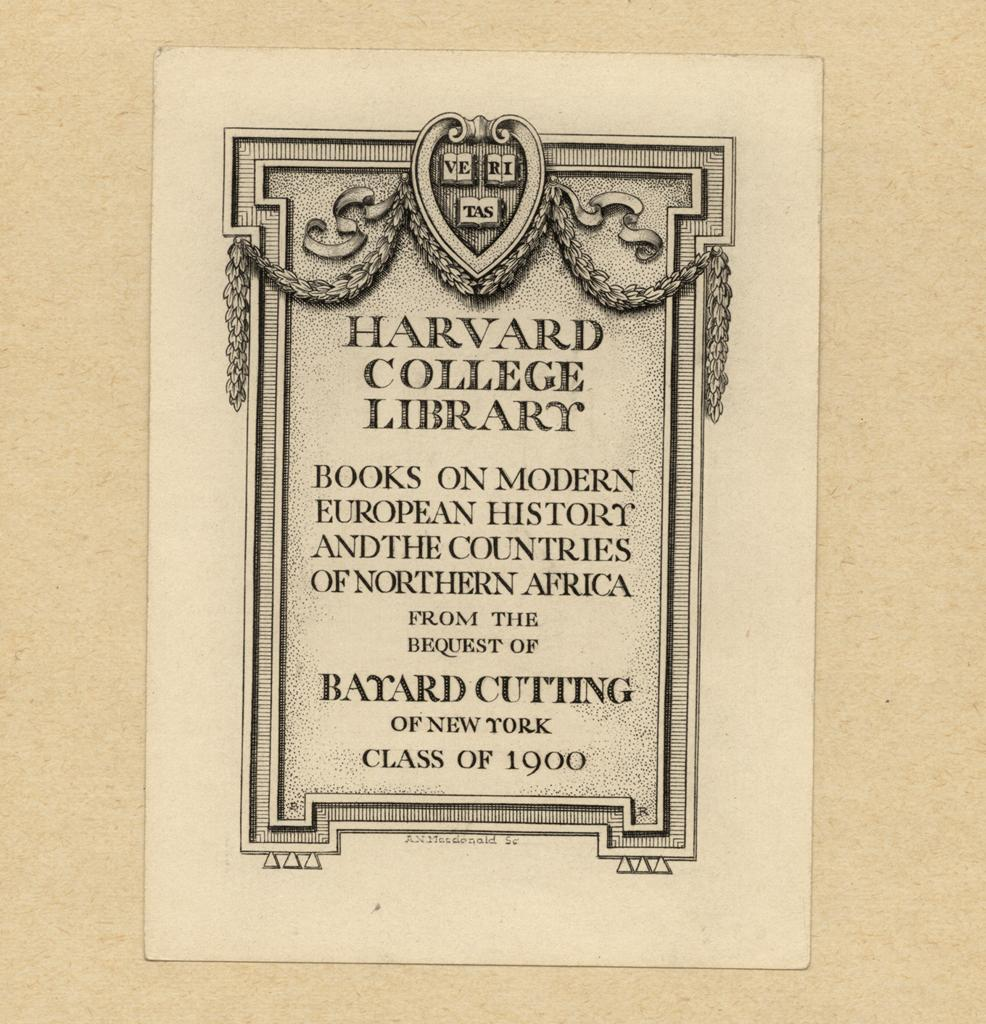
Type-based bookplate for the Harvard College Library

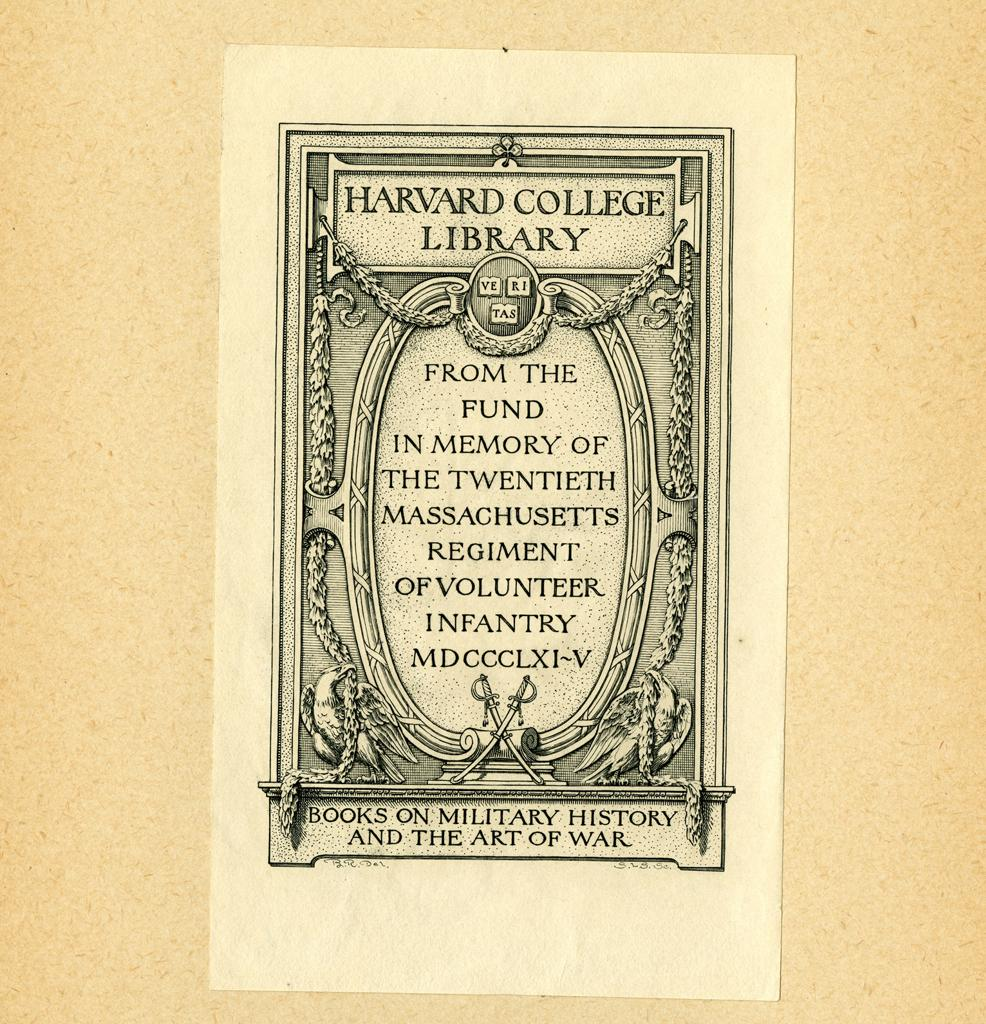
A second bookplate for the Harvard College Library, featuring a different typeface

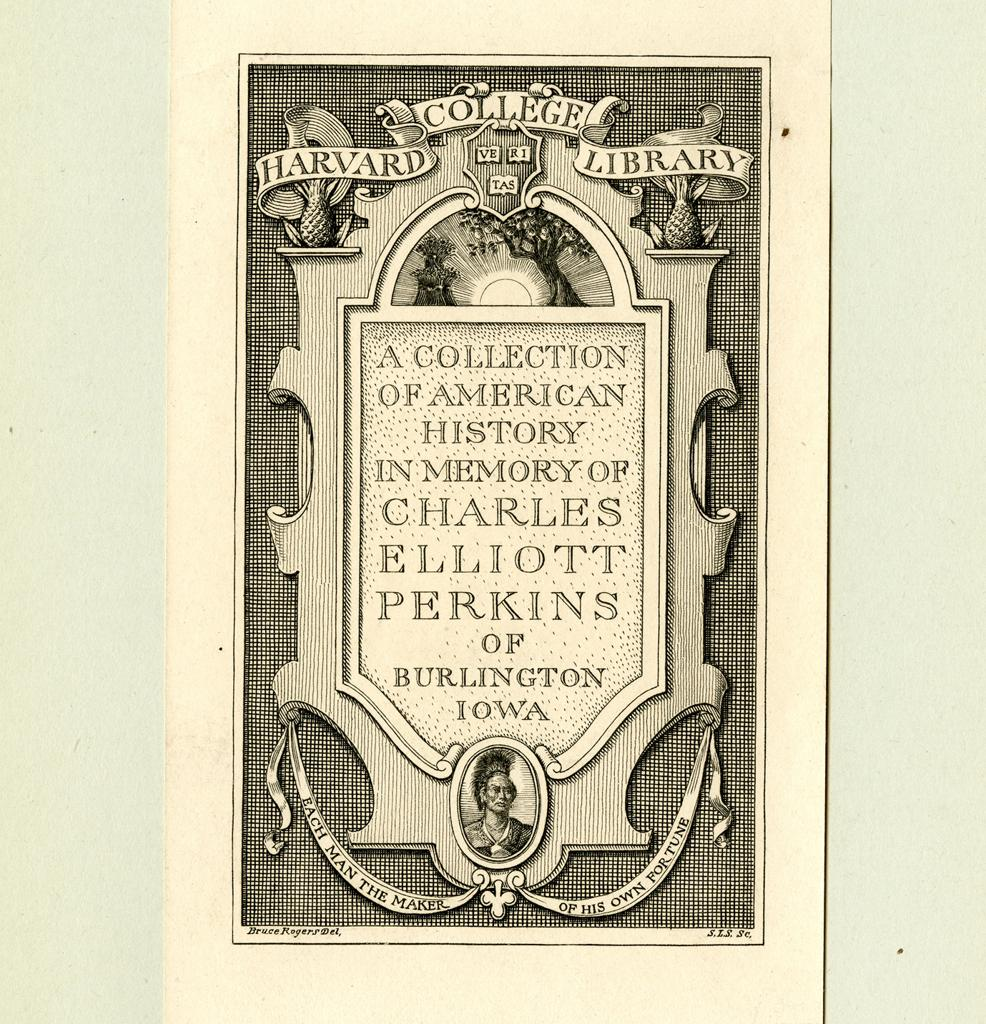
A third bookplate for the Harvard College Library, featuring a third typeface

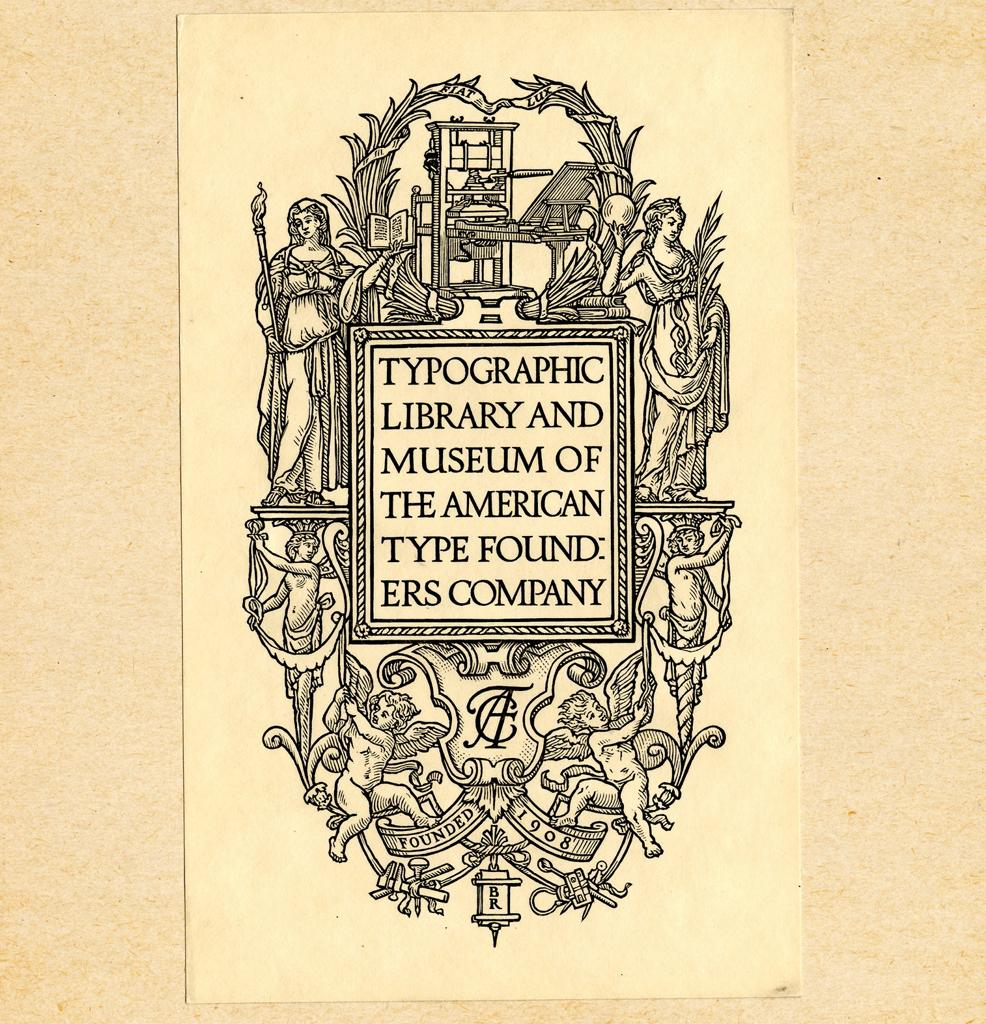
An elaborate Rogers bookplate for the Typographic Library and Museum of the American Type Founders Company
