= Vox-ATypI classification =

Classification system for typefaces

In typography, the Vox-ATypI classification makes it possible to classify typefaces into general classes. Devised by Maximilien Vox in 1954, it was adopted in 1962 by the Association Typographique Internationale (ATypI) and in 1967 as a British Standard, as British Standards Classification of Typefaces (BS 2961:1967), which is a very basic interpretation and adaptation/modification of the earlier Vox-ATypI classification.

Vox proposed a nine-type classification which tends to group typefaces according to their main characteristics, often typical of a particular century (15th, 16th, 17th, 18th, 19th, 20th century), based on a number of formal criteria: downstroke and upstroke, forms of serifs, stroke axis, x-height, etc. Although the Vox-ATypI classification defines archetypes of typefaces, many typefaces can exhibit the characteristics of more than one class.

Typographic parts of a glyph: 1) x-height; 2) ascender line; 3) apex; 4) baseline; 5) ascender; 6) crossbar; 7) stem; 8) serif; 9) leg; 10) bowl; 11) counter; 12) collar/link/neck; 13) loop; 14) ear; 15) tie; 16) horizontal bar; 17) arm; 18) vertical bar; 19) cap height; 20) descender height.

On April 27, 2021, ATypI announced that it had de-adopted the system and that it was establishing a working group building towards a new, larger system incorporating the different scripts of the world.

== Classicals ==
The classicals can be broken down into 'Venetian', 'Garalde', and 'Transitional' categories, and are characterized by triangular serifs, oblique axis, and low stroke contrast. In other classification systems, this group is often referred to as 'Oldstyle' or 'Old style'.

=== Venetian ===
Centaur, a Venetian typeface

Venetian (also called humanist, humanistic, or humanes) include the first Roman typefaces created during the 15th century by Venetian printers, such as Nicolas Jenson (hence the name 'Venetian'). These typefaces sought to imitate the formal hands found in the humanistic (renaissance) manuscripts of the time (humanist minuscule). These typefaces, rather round in opposition to the gothics of the Middle Ages, are characterized by bracketed serifs, a sloping on the lowercase 'e', ascenders with slanted serifs, and a balanced stroke contrast. These typefaces are inspired in particular by the Carolingian minuscule, imposed by Charlemagne during his reign of the Holy Roman Empire. (Note: The common typographic term 'old style' does not differentiate between Venetian and Garalde typefaces.)

Examples of Venetians include Centaur, Cloister, and Jenson.

=== Garalde ===
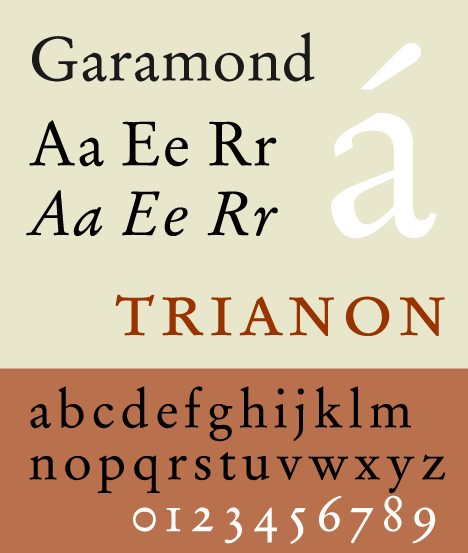
Garamond, a Garalde typeface

Garalde is a portmanteau of Garamond (named after Claude Garamond) and Aldine (another name for the category). The history of Aldine typefaces begins with an Italian punchcutter named Francesco Griffo who worked for the printer Aldus Manutius. In general, the Aldine typefaces had finer proportions than the Venetians, straight lowercase e bar, no slab serifs, and a stronger contrast between downstroke and upstroke. Weights are distributed according to an oblique axis. In France, under King Francis I, Garaldes became the tool used to officially fix grammar and orthography.

Examples of Garalde fonts include Bembo, Palatino and Garamond.

=== Transitional ===
Bulmer, a transitional typeface

The 'transitional', 'realist', or 'baroque' faces are the typical typefaces of the traditional period, particularly embodying the rational spirit of the Enlightenment. Weight is distributed now according to a quasi-vertical axis, stroke contrast is high, horizontal bar of lowercase e is straight and serifs are straight and unbracketed. The 'transitionals' were the result of the wish of Louis XIV to invent new typographical forms, on the one hand to find a successor of the Garamond, on the other hand to compete in quality with the different printers of Europe.

The term realist is unrelated to artistic realism; it derives from the Spanish word réales (meaning 'royal'), because of such a typeface cast by Christophe Plantin for King Philip II of Spain.

Examples of transitional typefaces include Baskerville, Bookman, Century Schoolbook, Times New Roman, and other contemporary redesigns of traditional faces.

== Moderns ==
The moderns can be broken down into Didone, Mechanistic, and Lineal categories, and are characterized by a simple, functional feel that gained momentum during the industrial period of the late 19th century and early 20th century.

=== Didone ===
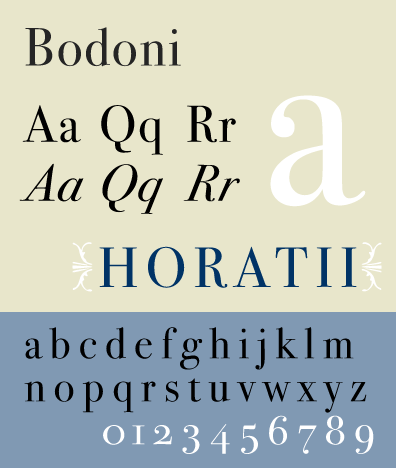
Bodoni, a Didone typeface

The Didones, or 'modern' typefaces, are named after the typefounders Didot and Bodoni. These typefaces, dating from the end of the 18th and the beginning of the 19th century, make a very strong contrast between full and connecting strokes (the connecting strokes being extremely fine), the verticality of the characters, and their unbracketed, hairline serifs. They correspond to the Didot of the Thibaudeau classification. The didones, in particular, made it possible for the First French Empire to employ typefaces very different from the typefaces used by the kings from the Ancien Régime.

Examples of Didones include Bodoni, Didot and Walbaum.

=== Mechanistic ===
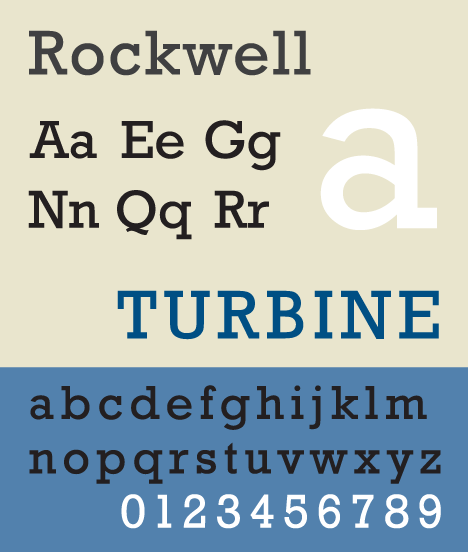
Rockwell, a mechanistic typeface

Also called mechanical, slab serif, or mécanes, the name of this group evokes the mechanical aspect of these typefaces, which coincide with the Industrial Revolution at the beginning of the 19th century. The principal characteristics of this typeface are very low contrast and rectangular slab serifs. They correspond to the Egyptiennes of Thibaudeau classification. This category includes both typefaces with bracketed serifs ('clarendons' or 'ionics') and typefaces with square or unbracketed serifs (egyptians).

Examples of mechanical typefaces include Clarendon, Egyptienne, Ionic No. 5, and Rockwell.

=== Lineal ===
Lineals, or linéales, combine all typefaces without serifs (called 'sans-serif', 'gothic', or grotesque), all of which correspond to the Antiques of the Thibaudeau classification. The British Standard 1967 extended the category by breaking the group into 4 subcategories: Grotesque, Neo-Grotesque, Geometric, and Humanist.

==== Grotesque ====
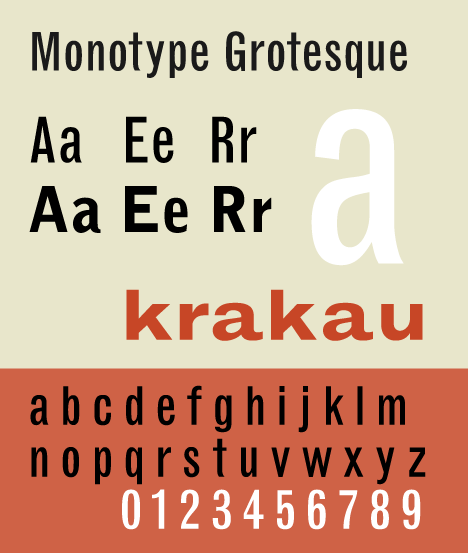
Monotype Grotesque, a grotesque lineal typeface

Grotesque typefaces are sans-serif typefaces that originated in the nineteenth century. There is some degree of contrast between thick and thin strokes. The terminals of curves are usually horizontal, and the typeface frequently has a spurred ⟨G⟩ and an ⟨R⟩ with a curled leg.

According to Monotype, the term "grotesque" originates from Italian: grottesco, meaning "belonging to the cave" due to their simple geometric appearance. The term arose because of adverse comparisons that were drawn with the more ornate Modern Serif and Roman typefaces that were the norm at the time.

Examples of grotesque lineal typeface include Headline, Monotype 215, and Grotesk no. 6.

==== Neo-grotesque ====
Helvetica, a neo-grotesque lineal typeface

Neo-grotesque typefaces are derived from the earlier grotesque faces, but generally have less stroke contrast and a more regular design. Unlike the grotesque, they generally do not have a spurred ⟨G⟩, and the terminals of curves are usually slanted. Many neo-grotesque faces have a large degree of subtlety and variation of widths and weights to accommodate different means of production (Hot type, foundry type, phototypesetting, see History of typography, 20th century).

Examples of neo-grotesque lineal typeface include Helvetica, Univers and Letter Gothic.

==== Geometric ====
Futura, a geometric lineal typeface

Geometric typefaces are sans-serif faces constructed from simple geometric shapes, such as circles or rectangles. The same curves and lines are often repeated throughout the letters, resulting in minimal differentiation between letters.

Examples of geometric lineal typefaces include ITC Avant Garde Gothic, Century Gothic, and Futura.

==== Humanist ====
Gill Sans, a humanist lineal typeface

Humanist typefaces, rather than deriving from the 19th-century grotesque faces, relate to earlier, classical handwritten monumental Roman capitals and a lowercase similar in form to the Carolingian script. The term humanist is used in combination with lineal to create a subcategory, and these typefaces only slightly resemble those in the humanist serif category.

Examples of humanist lineal typefaces include Gill Sans, Frutiger and Optima.

== Calligraphics ==
The Calligraphics can be broken down into 'glyphic', 'script', 'graphic', 'blackletter', and 'Gaelic' categories, and are characterized by a suggestion of being hand-crafted.

=== Glyphic ===
Trajan, a glyphic typeface

The glyphic, incised, or incise typefaces evoke the engraving or chiseling of characters in stone or metal, rather than calligraphic handwriting. They thus have small, triangular serifs or tapering downstrokes. There is usually greater emphasis on capital letters in glyphic typefaces, with some faces lacking lowercase letters.

Examples of glyphic typefaces include Albertus, Copperplate Gothic, and Trajan.

=== Script ===
Mistral, a script typeface

The scripts or scriptes include typefaces which evoke the formal penmanship of cursive writing. They seem to be written with a quill and have a strong slope. The letters can often be connected to each other. Typefaces imitating copperplate script form part of this family. Scripts are distinct from italic type.

Examples of script typefaces include Shelley, Mistral and Francesca.

=== Graphic ===
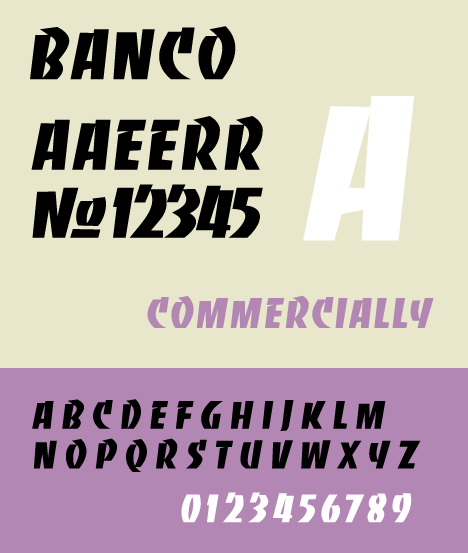
Banco, a graphic typeface

The graphic, manual, or manuaires are based on hand-drawn originals, slowly written with a brush, pen, pencil, or other writing instrument. These typefaces generally do not represent writing, and are not intended for body text, but instead display or headline purposes. Vox originally included the blackletter and uncial faces in this categorization.

Examples of graphic typefaces include Banco and Klang.

=== Blackletter ===
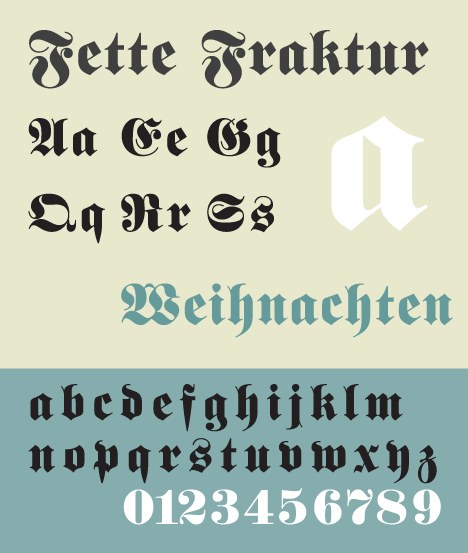
Fette Fraktur, a blackletter typeface

The original Vox classification contained the above nine groups. ATypI added two more classifications, the blackletters and the Non-Latins. The blackletters or German: fraktur [fractured, broken], which Vox included in the graphics, are characterized by pointed and angular forms, and are modeled on late medieval hands written with a broad-nibbed pen.

An example of a blackletter typeface family is Fraktur and Schwabacher.

=== Gaelic ===
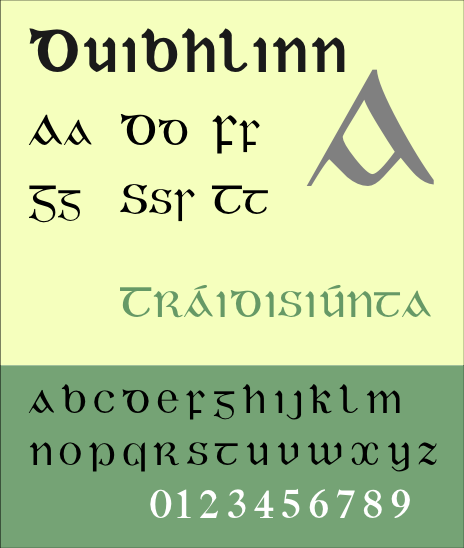
Duibhlinn, a Gaelic typeface

Gaelic type was added to the classification at the AGM of the Dublin meeting of ATypI, on 12 September 2010.

== Non-Latin ==
This heterogeneous family, not included in the original nine Vox groups, gathers (without distinction of style) all writing systems not based on the Latin alphabet: Greek, Cyrillic, Hebrew, Arabic, Chinese, Korean etc. English printers traditionally called these 'exotics'.

== Criticisms ==
Catherine Dixon, in a 2002 paper, criticized both the Vox and British Standard categories for favoring roman typefaces over display typefaces, which derives from early twentieth-century design culture. As an example, Dixon notes that in these classification systems "'humanist' types are formally distinguished from 'garalde', even though the formal differences are very subtle and such a distinction is only appropriate for very few types. But large numbers of slab serif types, clarendons or ionics (that is bracketed slab serifs) and egyptians (that is square-ended, unbracketed slab serifs) are simply grouped together." Dixon challenges the prevalent focus on roman types as being dated, saying "distinctions between text and display are now increasingly irrelevant, with the greater subtlety that has been introduced into sans serifs and slab serif designs, leading to a wider application of such types for text purposes." Dixon concludes that these systems have remained unchanged since 1967, and thus many contemporary typefaces render them inadequate. Miguel Catopodis, in the ATypI forum, proposed that the full 1962 Vox-AtypI classification needed to be uploaded and made more widely available, because the schema is still an easy resource for many students to understand how typefaces could be classified.

== Name ambiguities ==
The Vox classifications can be used in combination. Notably, 'transitional' (and its synonym 'realist') and 'humanist' are used to distinguish between groups of sans-serif (also called 'lineal', 'Gothic', or 'grotesque') typefaces, sometimes with the term sans-serif omitted. The sans-serif realists have more constant line weight, while the sans-serif humanists have a varying line weight which harks back to Carolingian minuscule. So, very different typefaces may be described by the same term: for example, Times New Roman and DIN 1451 may both be described as realist or transitional.

== Sources ==
- British Standards, vol. 2961, British Standards Institution, 1967
- Dixon, Catherine (2002), "Twentieth Century Graphic Communication: Technology, Society and Culture", Typeface classification (PDF), Friends of St Bride
- Campbell, Alastair (2000), The Designer's Lexicon: The Illustrated Dictionary of Design, Printing, and Computer Terms, San Francisco: Chronicle Books, p. 173, ISBN 0-8118-2625-2
- Haralambous, Yannis; Scott Horne, Translated by P. (2007), Fonts & Encodings, Sebastopol, Calif.: O'Reilly Media, pp. 409–411, ISBN 978-0-596-10242-5
- McLean, Ruari (2000), The Thames & Hudson Manual of Typography, London: Thames & Hudson, pp. 58–64, ISBN 0-500-68022-1
- Trésor de la langue française, Centre de recherche pour un Trésor de la langue française, 1994
