= Hightower Text =

Typeface

- Category: Serif
- Classification: Old-style; Venetian
- Designer: Tobias Frere-Jones
- Foundry: Font Bureau
- Date released: 1994
- Design based on: Nicolas Jenson

Hightower Text is a serif typeface designed by Tobias Frere-Jones. It is loosely based on the printing of Nicolas Jenson in Venice in the 1470s, in what is now called the "old style" of serif fonts.

Begun by Frere-Jones while he was a student, it was originally used in AIGA's magazine and released commercially by Font Bureau. It was named for the then-executive director of AIGA, Caroline Warner Hightower. It has been included with some Microsoft software such as versions of Microsoft Office. Some releases have been called "High Tower Text".

The family includes an italic style; this is Frere-Jones' design, since this style only emerged after Jenson's death. A commercial release is sold by Font Bureau in the OpenType format, which includes small capitals, ligatures and both lining and text figures. It does not include a bold style, which did not exist in Jenson's time.
