= Nicolas Jenson =

15th century French engraver, printer and type designer

Nicholas Jenson
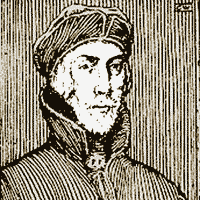
- Born: c. 1420; Sommevoire, France
- Died: 1480; Venice, Venetian Republic
- Occupations: Typographer; French engraver, type designer
- Known for: Roman Typeface
- Notable work: creation of Roman typeface, made the final definitive break from blackletter style

Nicholas (or Nicolas) Jenson (c. 1420–1480) was a French engraver, pioneer, printer and type designer who carried out most of his work in Venice, Italy. Jenson acted as Master of the French Royal Mint at Tours and is credited with being the creator of one of the finest early Roman typefaces. Nicholas Jenson has been something of an iconic figure among students of early printing since the nineteenth century when the artist William Morris praised the beauty and perfection of his roman font. Jenson is an important figure in the early history of printing and a pivotal force in the emergence of Venice as one of the first great centers of the printing press.

== History ==
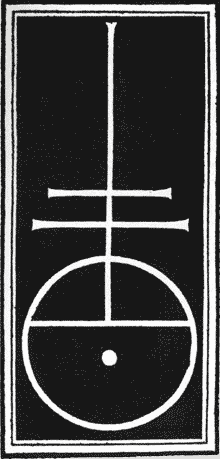
Jenson's typographer's mark

In October 1458, while acting as Master of the French Royal Mint, Jenson was sent to Mainz, by King Charles VII, to study the art of metal movable type. By the time Jenson arrived in Mainz, there were a number of established printers under which he could have been apprenticed. Jenson left Mainz in 1461.

Some hypothesize that Jenson studied under the tutelage of Johann Gutenberg, although there is no verifiable evidence of this. By this time Gutenberg's first press had been seized by Johann Fust, and historians are unsure of his activities during this period.

In 1468 Jenson went to Venice, opening a printing shop in 1470. The printer was prodigious in his publishing, eventually producing around 150 titles.

By the end of his life, Jenson was a wealthy man, producing liturgical, theological and legal texts in a variety of gothic fonts, the roman type left only for the odd commissioned work.

Andrea Torresano learned the printing trade and typography while working for Jenson in Venice. In 1479 he bought Jenson's printing business; Jenson died the following year, in 1480.

== Printing history ==
During the 1470s Nicholas Jenson's technical skill and business acumen helped establish Venice as Italy's publishing capital and in centuries since he has been celebrated for perfecting roman type, the rebirth of Latin inscription.

In 1477 Jenson was able to run as many as twelve presses at the same time. To lower prices and force out less productive rivals, he cut cursive gothic type, enabling him to print text and gloss on the same page for the first time.

== The Company ==
=== John of Cologne ===
John of Cologne, also known as "Big John" was another immigrant who was active in the Venetian printing trade. His specialisation was law books which accounted for half his output. produced Cicero's De Finibus in 1471, edited by Giorgio Merula. Hieronimo Squarciafico persuaded him to expand his range from law texts to Classical Latic texts.

Jenson and John were rivals who were starting to dominate the Venetian market with their specialisation in both Law books and Latin texts. In 1480 a contract was drawn up forming a syndicate between Jenson and John. They were so successful, being responsible for 43% of the editions by the next year (1481) that it became known as The Company.

== Jenson's printing ==
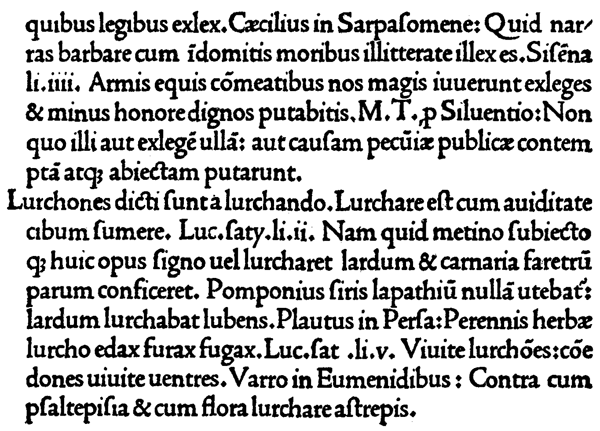
Roman type of Nicholas Jenson, 1472.

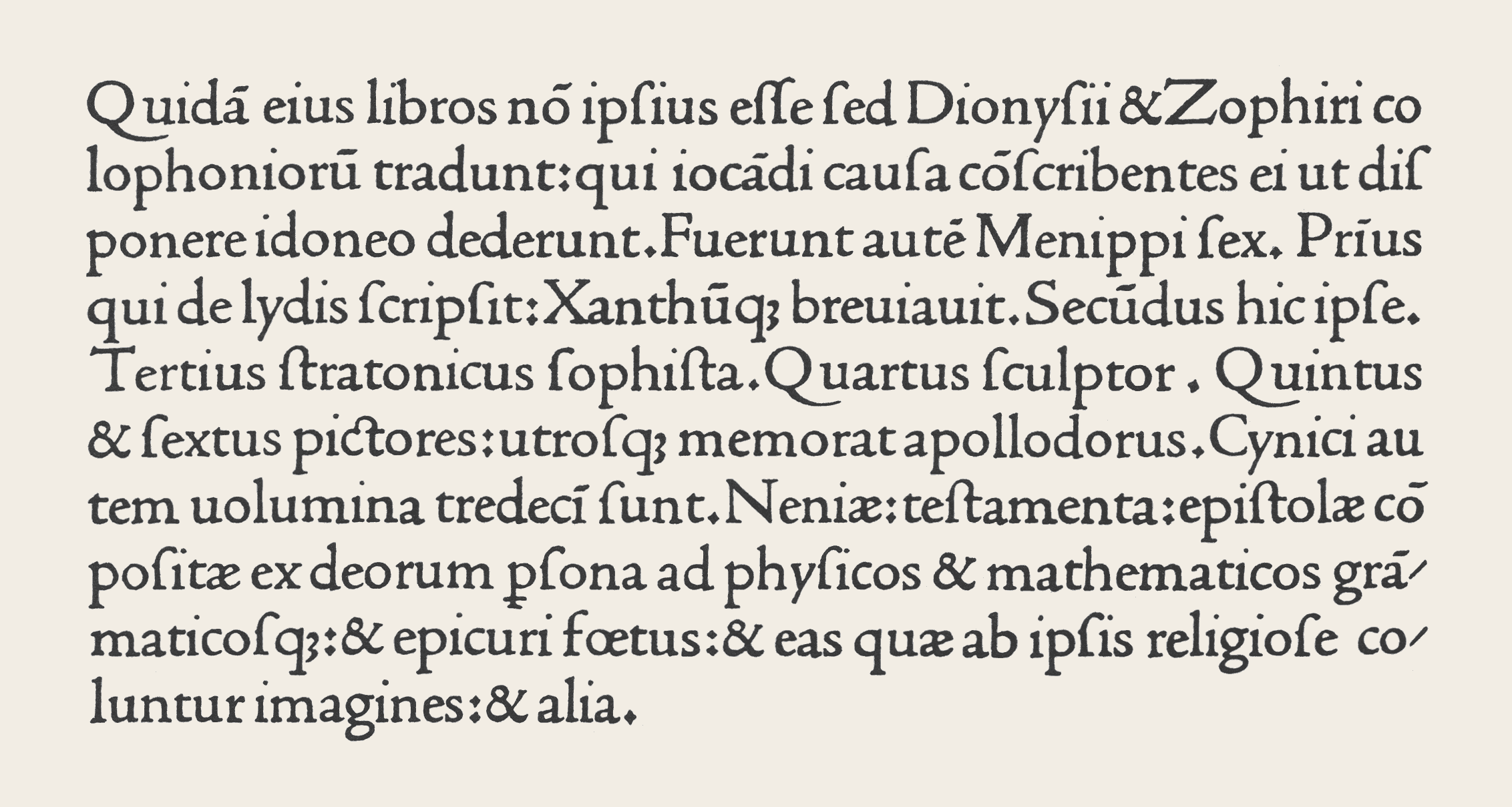
A specimen of Nicolas Jenson's archetypal roman typeface, from the "Laertis", published in Venice c. 1475.

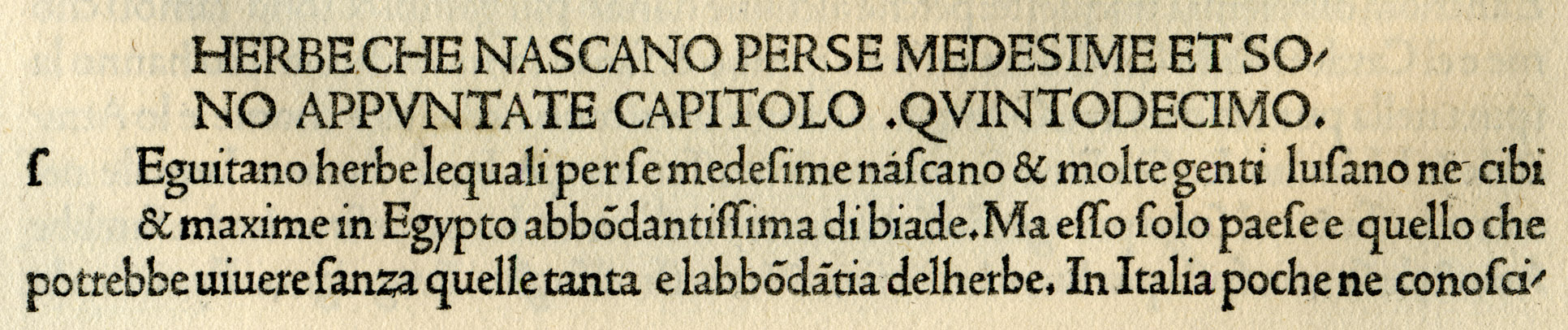
Capitals of Nicolas Jenson's roman typeface, from a translation 'in Fiorentina' (in Italian) of Pliny the Elder, published in Venice in 1476.

During the time of his arrival in Venice Jenson was quite successful as an artist but was financially successful as well. His early training as a goldsmith allowed him even greater sensitivities to the sculptural nature of type; the letters Jenson employed were often beautiful capitals that could summon the spirit of Rome.

Jenson's fame as one of history's greatest typeface designers and punch cutters rests on the types first used in his edition of Eusebius's Praeparatio Evangelica, which presents the full flowering of the roman type design.

Jenson's letters are clearly borrowing their shapes from the calligraphic shapes that preceded them, called littera Antica. These were in turn based on Carolingian minuscules, to which serifs, borrowed from the Imperial Roman capitals, were added. It was first in use in his 1470 edition of Eusebius. In 1471, a Greek typeface followed, which was used for quotations, and then in 1473 a Black Letter typeface, which he used in books on medicine and history.

In distinction to his contemporary printers, Jenson was able to expand his financial base. By 1477 he could run as many as twelve presses simultaneously. He was also responsible for launching two book trading companies, first in 1475 and then in 1480, under the name of Johannes de Colonia, Nicolaus Jenson et socii.

Some fonts inspired by Jenson include Golden Type and Cloister Old Style.

== Published works ==
The Manual Of Linotype Typography, Published 1923 by Linotype Company.
Caesar, Julius. Works, 1471. Printed in Venice by Nicolas Jenson, 1471
Nicolas Jenson printed one of the earliest and most beautiful editions of Caesar. We note here, especially the remarkable clarity and simplicity of the printer's Roman typeface, which drew its inspiration from etchings on Roman monuments. On this opening page, we are also treated to a wonderful illuminated initial and border.
VK 405, Bible in Latin, Nicolas Jenson, Venice, 1479
The Bible was written by forty different human authors over a 1500-year period. While the original Autographs were "perfect", the process of hand-copying resulted in derivations from the original texts. Of the French printers of the era from Nicolas Jenson came nearly a hundred of the finest books produced in the fifteenth century. This is the first Bible to be issued from Jenson’s press, of this Latin Bible, issued in 1479, Pope Sixtus IV conferred upon him the honorary title of Count Palatine.
Pliny, Natural History, 1476. Printed in Venice by Nicolas Jenson. 1,025 copies (1,000 paper, 25 vellum).
The Pliny the Elder text was printed as a partnership venture between Jenson and the Strozzi family, who backed the venture financially. It is a vernacular text, with translation by Cristoforo Landino. "The Pliny text was printed (in a font closely simulating the modern humanist handwriting in which the manuscript of the work might have been written) with wide margins, without initial capital letters at the beginning of chapters, and with its titles isolated in a sea of blank paper on the frontispiece, crying out for illustration and decoration."

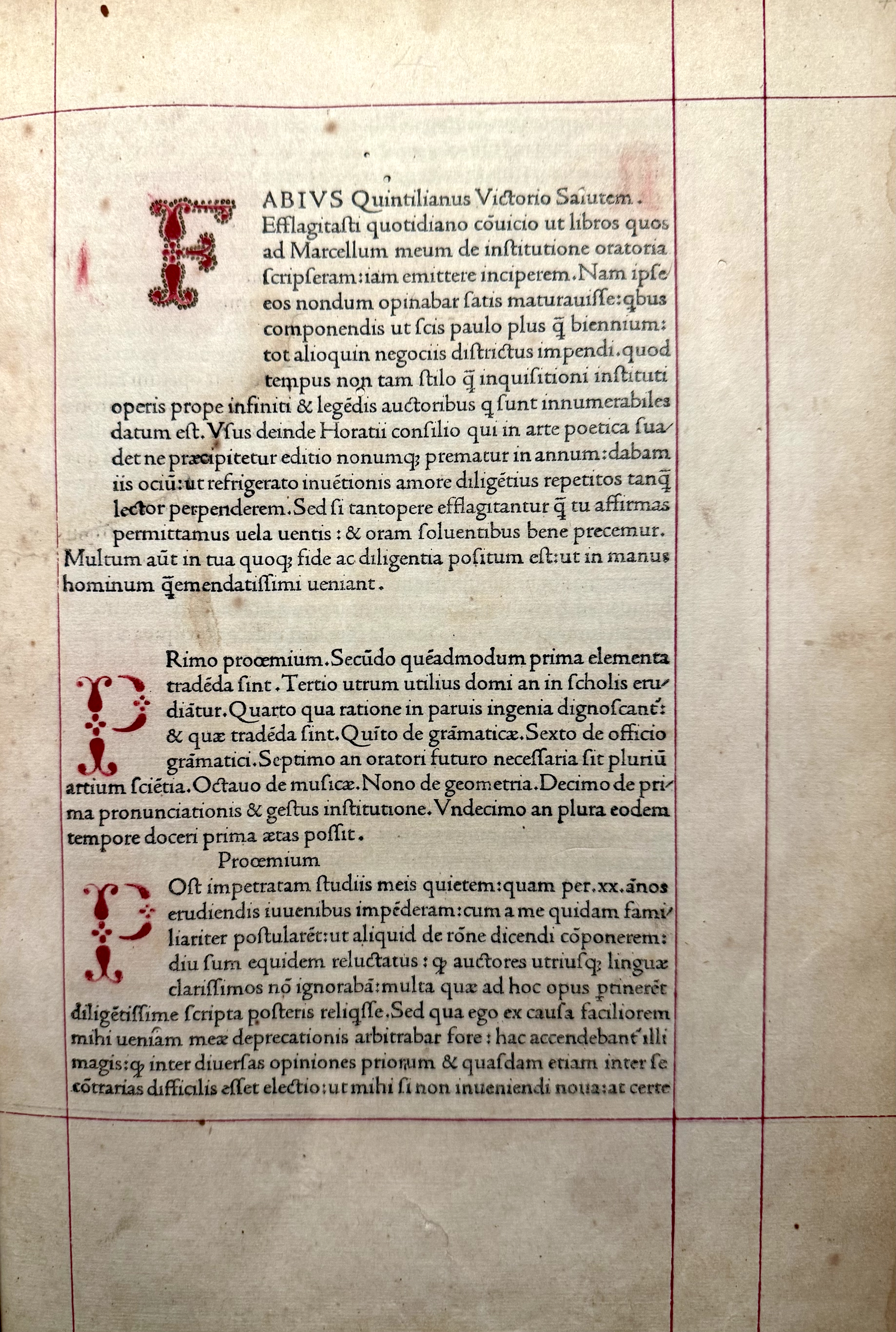
Quintilian's Institutiones oratoriae (Institutio Oratoria) Nicolas Jenson, Venice, 1471

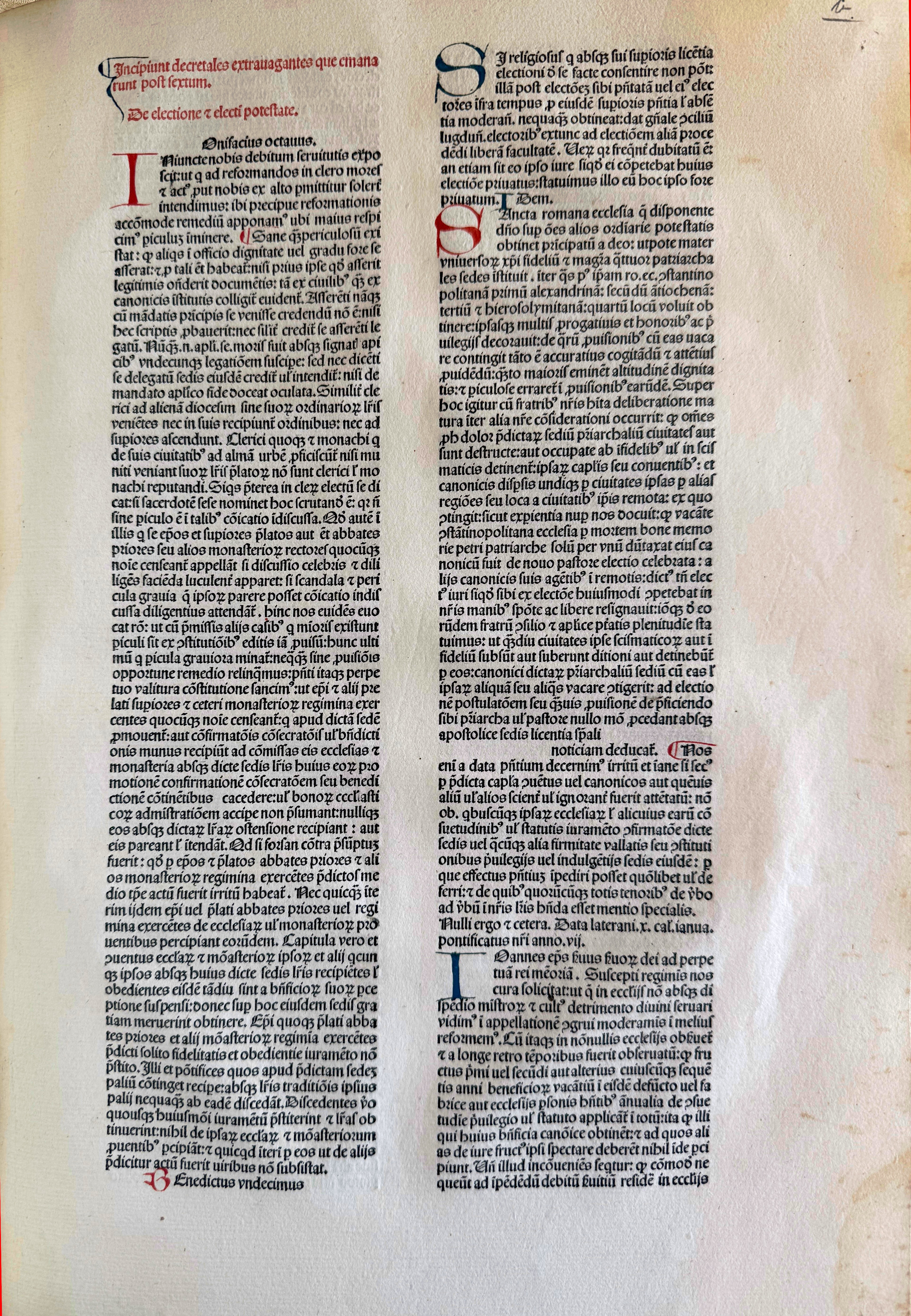
Pope John XXII's Extravagantes, Nicolas Jenson, Venice, 1476

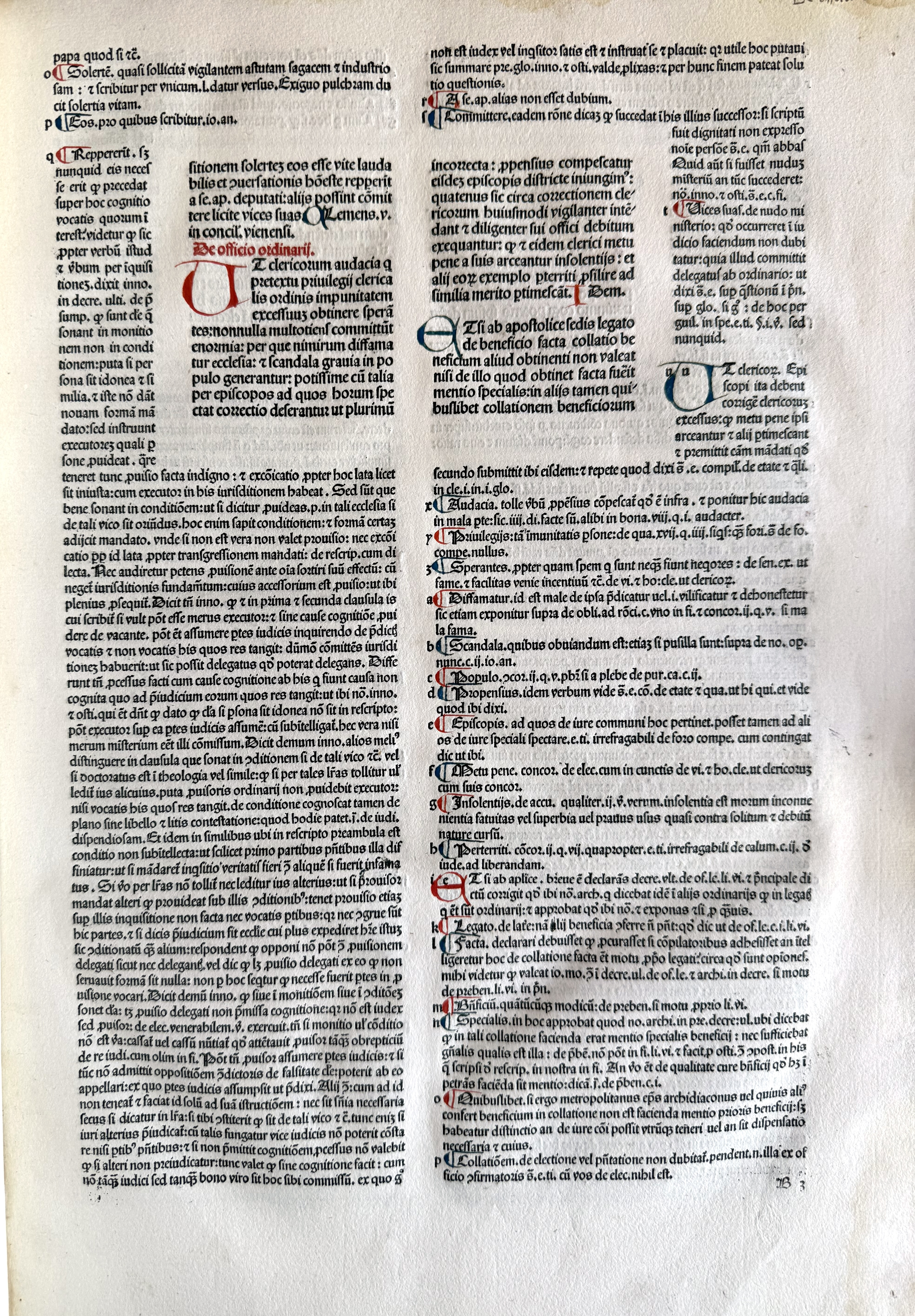
Pope Clement V's Constitutiones Clementis papae V, Nicolas Jenson, Venice, 1479

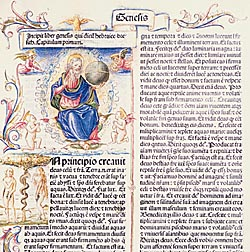
VK 405, Bible in Latin, Nicolas Jenson, Venice, 1479

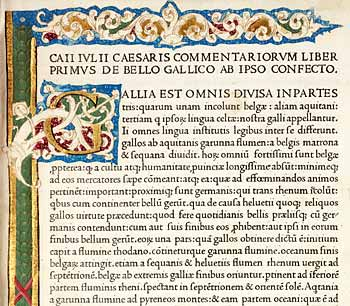
Julius Caesar's Works, printer Nicolas Jenson, 1471

Pliny the Elder's Natural History, printer Nicolas Jenson, 1476

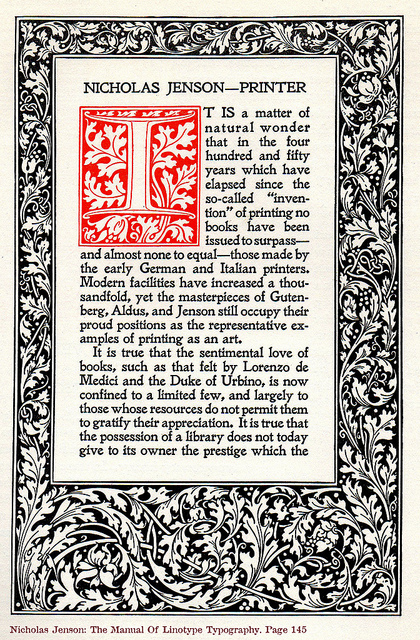
The Manual Of Linotype Typography, published 1923

== See also ==
- Bembo
- History of western typography
- Typeface
- Adobe Jenson
- Roman typeface
- William Morris
- Bruce Rogers (typographer)
