= Rodney Durso =

American artist and graphic designer

Rodney Durso is a New-York based contemporary artist and graphic designer. He founded the nonprofit organization ArtBridge. Durso primarily works in acrylic paints and mixed media. His works are known for their vibrant, free-form structure.

== Education ==
In 1987, Durso received a Bachelor of Science Degree in Marketing, Design and Advertising from Boston University's School of Mass Communications. He also studied and worked in commercial television production in the United Kingdom. Additionally, he has studied architecture, film, and fine arts at Columbia University and Parsons School of Design, and has studied with Milton Glaser, Paul Davis and Ed Benguiat at the School of Visual Arts.

== Career ==
Durso's career began with advertising and graphic design before it shifted towards a more creative path. In 1999, Durso founded Stormhouse Partners, Inc. in New York City, an international award-winning strategic branding and design agency. He served as the creative director and principal there and managed all client branding initiatives until 2005.

In 2006, Durso began teaching as an adjunct professor at Parsons School of Design.

Also in 2006, he rented studio space in the West Chelsea Arts Building, where he started to paint "as a way of prying [himself] out from [his] daily work routine". Since then, he has had numerous domestic and international, solo and group exhibitions. National exhibits include the James Cohan Gallery and the Gotham Art Gallery in New York, at The High Line Loft in New York, and the Alfa Art Gallery in New Jersey, and internationally he has had shows in London, Basel Switzerland, and Venice Italy.

In 2008, Durso created a way for local artists to get exposure by founding ArtBridge Projects, an arts non-profit which curates and installs art on construction scaffolding. There have been nearly 100 ArtBridge exhibitions in locations including all of New York City's five boroughs; Kingston, and in partnership with Off Site Art in L'Aquila, Italy, of which Durso is a co-founder. Durso continues to lead ArtBridge as board chair and member of the executive committee.

Currently, Durso remains focused on creating new artworks while simultaneously serving ArtBridge. He is also working on his design practice, DursoCreative, a newly formed branding and design studio located in west Chelsea.

== Work ==
Durso's artwork include acrylic paintings and collages on paper and canvas. Much of his work is both abstract and nonfigurative, and many of its elements strongly reflect both a background and interest in graphic design. His paintings are created spontaneously, as Durso claims they can "come out of thin air". His art-making approach is a response to a structured method of thinking, and his process is characterized as revealing a narrative or visual story. Durso's design work is based on 20 plus years as a Creative Director and educator.

== Personal ==
Durso lives in West Chelsea and has a studio in the West Chelsea Arts Building. He has homes in Connecticut and Colorado.
