= Old Style (Miller & Richard) =

Series of serif typefaces

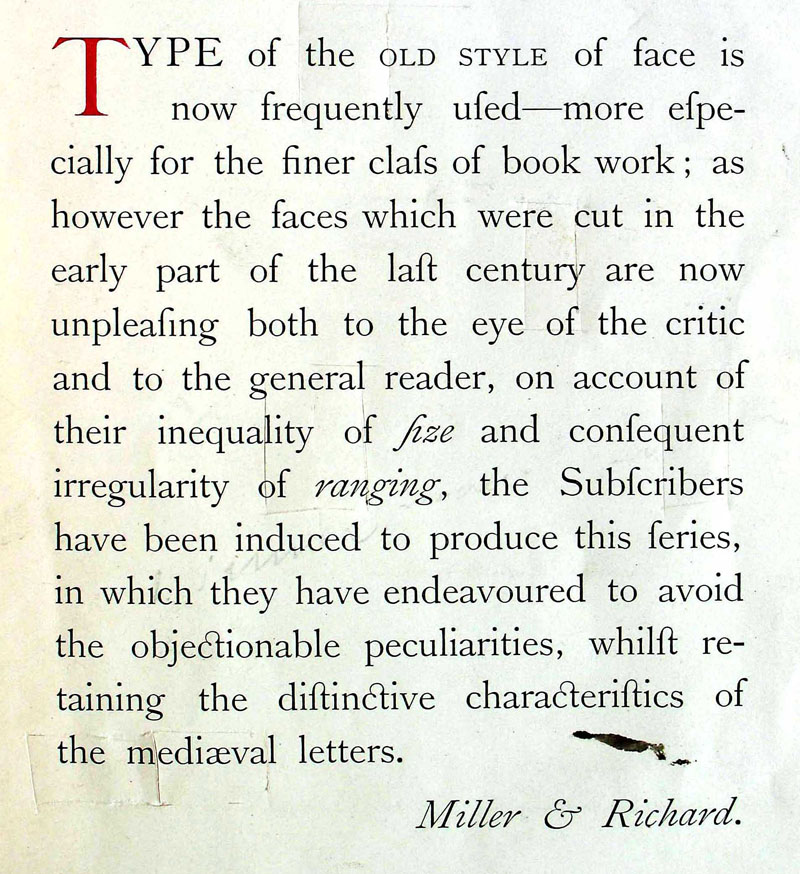
Miller & Richard's original specimen for their Old Style fonts, in a mock-traditional style with the long s and archaic ligatures.

Old Style, later referred to as modernised old style, is a series of serif typefaces cut from the mid-nineteenth century and sold by the type foundry Miller & Richard, of Edinburgh in Scotland. It was a standard typeface in Britain for literary and prestigious printing in the second half of the nineteenth century and the early twentieth century, with many derivatives and copies released.

The Old Style faces of Miller & Richard, reportedly cut by punchcutter Alexander Phemister, were made in imitation of earlier styles of typeface, particularly the Caslon typeface cut by William Caslon from the 1720s, but with a modernised design. It was immediately very successful: the 1880s Bibliography of Printing describes its popularity as "unsurpassed in the annals of type-founding".

The exact date of Old Style's release is apparently uncertain as Miller & Richard published specimens erratically, but according to James Mosley and Morris it first appears in an 1860 specimen.

== Design ==
Like Caslon, Old Style has slanting top serifs and an avoidance of abrupt transitions of weight, but compared to Caslon it is much lighter in colour and the stress is vertical (the top of the round letters uniformly the thinnest part of the letter, rather than at a position of roughly eleven o'clock), reflecting changes in taste since the eighteenth century. The letters are rather wide and the italic is evenly, and rather strongly slanted. The two-way Q recalls the Baskerville type of the mid-eighteenth century. Hugh Williamson describes it as "large on the body, light and open, and rather wide".

The name "old style" is confusing, as it and "old face" have been used differently by different authors to refer to "true old-style" printing types from around 1480–1750 (and relatively authentic copies of them) and the new "Old Style" face of Miller & Richard and its imitations, which appear rather different. Walter Tracy and others have used the term "modernised old style" to describe the Miller & Richard designs to reduce ambiguity, although "Old Style" was the name under which Miller and Richard sold it. It is sometimes classified as a "transitional" serif typeface (in the vein of typefaces of the eighteenth century such as Baskerville) due to these modernisations.

The typeface Bookman Old Style is a descendant of a bolder version of the Old Style face, known in the nineteenth century as Old Style Antique. ("Antique" in this case means a slab serif-style design, with thicker build, emphatic serifs and possibly reduced stroke contrast, rather than an old-fashioned design.)

== Gallery ==
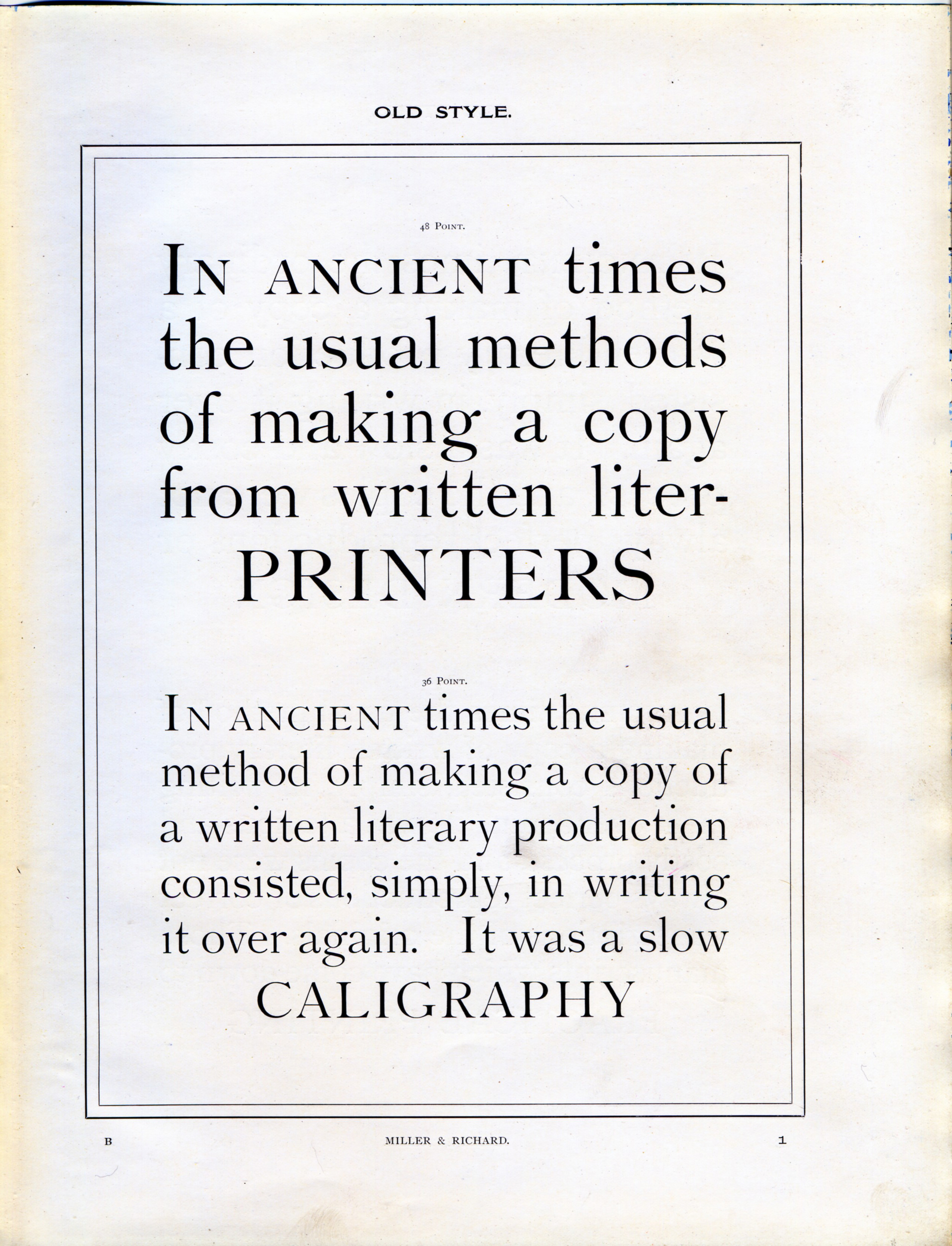
Old Style in a Miller & Richard specimen, showing its quite wide, light structure.

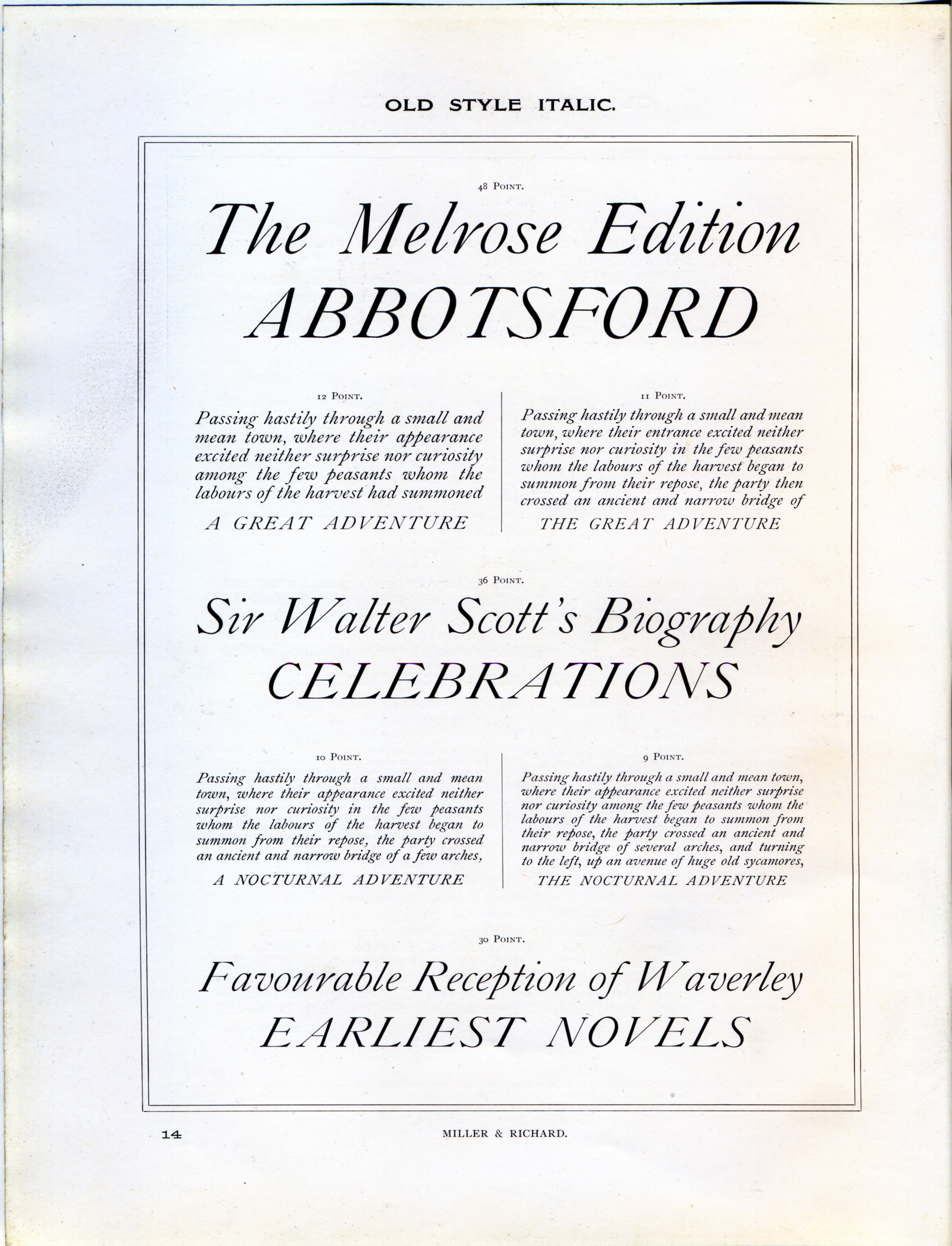
Old Style Italic in a Miller & Richard specimen. The italic has a strong slant.

== History ==
Released at a time when Caslon type was coming back into fashion, Old Style became a standard typeface sold by many foundries. It was also copied by the new hot metal typesetting companies Monotype and Linotype. Monotype's copy was their second best-selling typeface of all time in hot metal. Besides simple copies, it helped to create a genre of a wide range of loose revivals and adaptations of the Caslon design, visible in the wide-spreading arms of the T and the sharp half-arrow serifs on many letters. (Ronaldson Old Style by Alexander Kay was another, as was Phemister's own later Franklin, created after he had emigrated to the United States.) Legros and Grant parodied the large number of copies of Old Style in their 1916 textbook on printing technology, Typographical Printing Surfaces, by printing a poem with different lines in different copies.

Reviews of the aesthetic quality of Old Style in the mid-twentieth century were often low, despite its precise and careful design, and it declined in popularity. While recognising its practicality in his book A Tally of Types, it was described by Stanley Morison in 1935 as "a sort of diluted version of Caslon", by Williamson as "rather thin and colourless", by William Morris's biographer William S. Peterson as "a pallid imitation of Caslon" and by Mosley as "bland". It generally went out of fashion in body text in favour of new designs such as Times New Roman or more authentic revivals such as Baskerville and Bembo by the mid-twentieth century in Britain, although Hugh Williamson in 1956 noted that it was still popular for niche uses due to an extensive character support accumulated over the years of its popularity. More positive reviews come from Nesbitt, who describes it as "a light face, but well-designed throughout" and Macmillan, who describes Phemister's engraving technique as "of the highest quality". (Note: William Morris found it and other typefaces of the period excessively light on the paper, although some have felt that his custom Golden Type, intended as a corrective, overshot in the opposite direction. Some printers intending to copy his style used the "Old Style Antique" bolder version of Old Style for body text in order to imitate his work.)

Several digitisations are available, often of later hot metal adaptations. (Note: Monotype's "Series 46" "Old Style", with a quite different design is also based on a Miller & Richard typeface, but a "modern" serif font in a different genre, known in the USA as the "Scotch" style. It has a 't' where the horizontal and vertical strokes make a right angle at top left. Monotype's Series 20 OId Style Special is a loose Caslon adaptation.)
