= Korinna =

1904 typeface by H. Berthold AG

Example of the Korinna typeface

Korinna is a serif typeface first released by the H. Berthold AG type foundry in 1904. A revival of the typeface was designed in 1974 by Ed Benguiat and Vic Caruso for the International Typeface Corporation (ITC). Their version follows the formulary ITC approach of increased x-height, and multiple weights from light to ultra. The face is named for the ancient Greek poet.

== Notable uses ==
Korinna is widely known for its usage in television. It is perhaps best known for being the display font for the clues on the trivia game show Jeopardy! since 1984. It was also used on ABC's Good Morning America from 1986 to 1988, as the chapter placard typeface for the television series Frasier, Hank Parker's Outdoor Magazine, TNN's New Country, Mork & Mindy, The Joy of Painting public television series from 1986 to 1989, and for home videos such as Paramount Home Video's warning screen from 1989 to 1995. The graphics were produced by Univision from 1987 until 1990 and the end credits were produced by Televisa in Mexico. Japanese video game developer and publisher Capcom has always used the Korinna typeface, for both its former and current logos. The Walt Disney Company used the font when re-releasing its animated features to theatres and VHS by labelling them as Walt Disney's Classic on the movie posters and VHS covers, the word classic in Korinna typeface. The font was used for title and heading text on some Advanced Dungeons and Dragons books and is used for the current GURPS logo. It was also used to render the subtitle text in the music video to Devo's "Whip It". It features prominently as cover typeface of every The Most Famous Hotels in the World Book since 1986. It is also used as the primary textual font in many newspapers both local and nationwide.

== See also ==
- Benguiat, a similar-styled typeface by ITC

== Sources ==
- Blackwell, Lewis. 20th Century Type. Yale University Press: 2004. ISBN 0-300-10073-6.
- Fiedl, Frederich, Nicholas Ott and Bernard Stein. Typography: An Encyclopedic Survey of Type Design and Techniques Through History. Black Dog & Leventhal: 1998. ISBN 1-57912-023-7.
- Jaspert, Beny and Johnson. Encyclopedia of Typefaces. Cassell Paperback, London; 2001. ISBN 1-84188-139-2.
