= International Typeface Corporation =

American type foundry

The International Typeface Corporation (ITC) was a type manufacturer founded in New York in 1970 by Aaron Burns, Herb Lubalin and Edward Rondthaler. The company was one of the world's first type foundries to have no history in the production of metal type. It is now a wholly owned brand or subsidiary of Monotype Imaging.

== History ==
The company was founded to design, license and market typefaces for filmsetting and computer set types internationally. The company issued both new designs and revivals of older or classic faces, invariably re-cut to be suitable for phototypesetting and later digital use and produced in families of different weights. Although it is claimed that the designers took care to preserve the style and character of the original typefaces, several ITC revivals, such as ITC Bookman and ITC Garamond in particular, have received criticism that the result was related in name only to the original faces. Among the company's notable type designers was Ed Benguiat, the creator of Tiffany and Benguiat fonts.

ITC's revival designs frequently followed a formulary of increased x-height, multiple weights from light to ultra bold, multiple widths and unusual ligature combinations, sometimes with alternate characters such as swashes.

Critics sometimes complain that, while the dramatically higher x-height increased legibility in smaller point sizes, in normal text sizes the extreme height of the lowercase characters imparted a commercial, subjective voice to texts.

ITC typefaces were widely distributed. Gene Gable commented "You could easily say that ITC designs put a face on the '70s and '80s. [...] You couldn't open a magazine or pass a billboard in the '70s without seeing [them]."

== Typefaces ==
- ITC American Typewriter
- ITC Anna
- ITC Arecibo
- ITC Arid
- ITC Atelier Sans
- ITC Avant Garde Gothic
- Avenida
- ITC Ballerino
- ITC Barcelona
- ITC Batak
- ITC Bauhaus
- ITC Beesknees
- ITC Benguiat and Benguiat Gothic
- ITC Berranger Hand
- ITC Better
- ITC Binary
- ITC Blair
- ITC Blackadder
- ITC Black Tulip
- ITC Blaze
- ITC Bodoni
- ITC Bolt
- ITC Bookman
- ITC Bradley Hand
- ITC Braganza
- ITC Busorama
- ITC Caslon
- ITC Century type family
- ITC Cerigo
- ITC Charter
- ITC Cheltenham
- ITC Chino
- ITC Chivalry
- ITC Conduit
- ITC Cushing
- ITC Dartangnon
- Data 70
- ITC Django
- ITC Edwardian Script
- ITC Elan
- ITC Ellipse
- ITC Eras
- Eras Demi ITC
- ITC Esprit
- ITC Fenice
- ITC Flora
- ITC Fontoon
- ITC Forkbeard
- ITC Franklin Gothic
- ITC Freestyle Script
- ITC Friz Quadrata
- ITC Garamond
- ITC Gamma
- Gigi
- ITC Giovanni
- ITC Golden Cockerel
- ITC Golden Type
- ITC Goudy Sans
- ITC Grimshaw Hand
- ITC Handel Gothic
- ITC Highlander
- ITC Humana Sans
- ITC Isadora
- ITC Jamille
- ITC Jokerman Hellenic
- ITC Johnston
- ITC Juanita
- ITC Juice
- ITC Kabel
- ITC Kahana
- ITC Keefbats
- ITC Kendo
- ITC Klepto
- ITC Kloegirl
- ITC Korigan
- ITC Korinna
- ITC Kristen
- ITC Leawood
- ITC Legacy Sans and Serif
- ITC Lubalin Graph
- ITC Luna
- ITC Machine
- ITC Matisse
- ITC Mendoza Roman
- ITC Migration Sans
- ITC Mixage
- ITC Modern No. 216
- ITC Mona Lisa
- ITC Motter Corpus
- ITC Musclehead
- Neue Aachen
- ITC New Baskerville
- ITC ITC Newtext
- ITC New Winchester
- ITC Novarese
- ITC Obelisk
- ITC Obliqua
- ITC Officina Sans and Serif
- ITC Ozwald
- ITC Panache
- Papyrus
- ITC Pioneer
- ITC Pious Henry
- ITC Plaza
- ITC Portago
- ITC Posterboy
- ITC Quay Sans
- ITC Quorum
- Rage
- ITC Redonda
- ITC Ronda
- ITC Serif Gothic
- ITC Slimbach
- ITC Souvenir
- ITC Snap
- ITC Stenberg
- ITC Stone Sans
- ITC Stone Informal
- ITC Stylus
- ITC Styleboy
- ITC Symbol
- ITC Tabula
- ITC Tetra
- ITC Tiepolo
- ITC Tiffany
- ITC Tempus Sans
- ITC University of California Old Style
- ITC Usherwood
- ITC Veljovic
- ITC Vineyard
- ITC Vintage
- ITC Weber Hand
- ITC Weidemann
- ITC William Hamilton Page
- ITC Willow
- ITC Zapf Chancery
- ITC Zapf Dingbats
- ITC Zemke Hand

== U&lc magazine ==
The company published U&lc (Upper and Lower Case), a typographic magazine dedicated to showcasing their traditional and newer typefaces in particularly creative ways, originally edited and designed by Herb Lubalin until his death in May, 1981. Because of its extraordinary blend of typographic design, illustration and cartoons (sometimes by world-renowned artists and cartoonists such as Lou Myers), verse and prose extolling the virtues of well-designed type, as well as contributions by amateur or semi-professional typographers, the magazine was avidly read by type enthusiasts and sought after by collectors the world over.

A web version of the magazine started in 1998, along with a brand-new sans-serif logo by Mark van Bronkhorst (replacing the famous swash lettered logo by Herb Lubalin). In an editorial, John D. Berry wrote: "There’ll be plenty of overlap between the print magazine and the online magazine, but they won’t be identical: some things are best done with ink on paper, others are best done on screen." Yet the paper edition, which in 1998 had shrunk in format from tabloid pages to 8.5" x 11", did not survive for long. The final printed edition was vol. 26 no. 2, dated fall 1999. The last numbered U&lc issue is 42.1.1, issued in 2010.

A book celebrating U&lc, U&lc: influencing design & typography by John D. Berry (the magazine's final editor) was published by Mark Batty in 2005.

In October 2010 Allan Haley announced on the Fonts.com blog that the complete run of U&lc had been digitized and would be made available, one year's worth per month, via PDF download from that same blog.

As part of a Fonts.com redesign in 2012, access to U&lc articles were moved to the fonts.com blog, and Learn About Fonts & Typography for various U&lc web edition articles.

== Acquisitions and mergers ==
In 1986 the company was acquired by Esselte Letraset, who had taken over Letraset, originally makers of the first dry transfer lettering, and later to become developers of new typefaces for filmsetting and computer applications. In 2000, Agfa Monotype Corporation announced the acquisition of the capital stock of International Typeface Corporation (ITC) from Esselte. The transaction included ITC's complete library of over 1600 typefaces, all typeface subscriber and distributor agreements, the itcfonts.com Web site, and typographic software. At this point ITC ceased to operate as an independent entity.

In November 2005 Agfa Monotype was incorporated as Monotype Imaging, with a focus on the company's traditional core competencies of typographic design and professional printing. Famous contemporary typographers associated with Monotype include Adrian Frutiger, Hermann Zapf and Matthew Carter.
