= Friz Quadrata =

Serif font

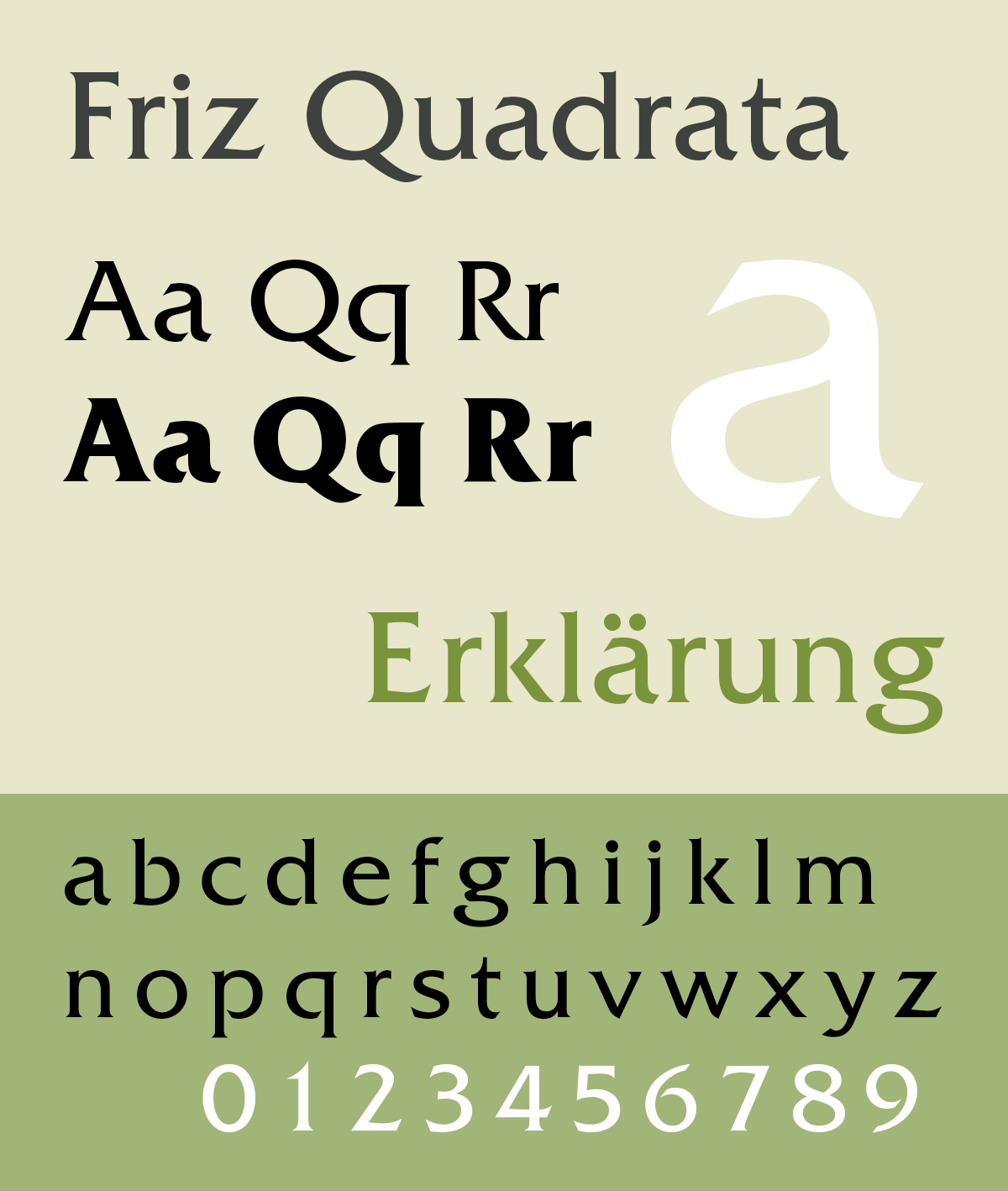
- Category: Serif
- Classification: Incised
- Designers: Ernst Friz; Victor Caruso
- Foundry: ITC/Linotype
- Date released: 1966

Friz Quadrata is a glyphic serif typeface designed by Ernst Friz and Victor Caruso for Visual Graphics Corporation in 1966. VGC worked with the International Typeface Corporation to create an additional, bold weight. It is currently available from the ITC and Linotype foundries. Because of its level of detail and graphic weight, it is often used as a display font, for short texts and headlines.

== Usage ==
Friz Quadrata is highly recognizable, and its strong, classic look has been used by a range of institutions and entities. The regular version was used for all official logos of the Chilean government up until 2010. It is the typeface for the Quebec wordmark and on the identifying signage of 1 Police Plaza, the headquarters of the New York City Police Department. The Computer Entertainment Rating Organization of Japan uses the bold font for its logo, with Helvetica Black used for letters in its game ratings. The New Mexico Democratic Party uses the font for its logo, as did the now-defunct Progressive Conservative Party of Canada from 1996 up until the party's dissolution in 2003. The town of Stony Plain, Alberta uses the font for their current logo, and signage around the town. The City of Portland, Oregon also uses the font in its street name blade signs for the Skidmore-Old Town Historic District.

=== Educational institutions and athletics ===
The logos of the University of Arizona, the University of Wisconsin - Madison, the SUNY Polytechnic Institute, Bond University, Loyola University New Orleans, Sepuluh Nopember Institute of Technology (full name part of logo only) and Polish private university Wyższa Szkoła Zarządzania i Bankowości are in Friz Quadrata — along with Austin Community College in Austin, TX, the University of North Dakota in Grand Forks, ND, and King's College in Charlotte, NC. The Royal Central School of Speech and Drama formerly used Friz Quadrata while the University of Cincinnati uses it for its sports teams, as (up until 2015) did the Phoenix/Arizona Coyotes of the NHL for the names on its uniforms. The italic version is used by the University of Cincinnati Bearcats on athletic uniforms and logos.

=== Television shows, motion pictures, and music ===
Because of its actual usage by the New York City Police Department, Friz Quadrata appears in the titles and credits sequences of the TV series Law & Order and its numerous spin-offs. The font was also used in the end credits of most movies made by DreamWorks Animation, as well as serving as the credits of the 1983 film Scarface. The font is often used by Quentin Tarantino for starting and end credits. For almost ten years it was used for the TV One logo in New Zealand. Recording artists Steely Dan use the bold version of the font on the title treatment for their album Gaucho. The font can also be seen in the logos of rock and punk bands The Offspring, Black Flag, and Bad Religion, whilst singer Mariah Carey used the typeface on many album covers. The Indonesian music recording label and publisher Nagaswara used the typeface for its logo, as well as its websites and social media accounts which appear in its latest music videos. The font was also used in the logo for Mike Flanagan's 2019 film Doctor Sleep and his production company, Red Room Pictures. It is also used by American singer Selena Gomez when promoting the album Rare; it appears on all versions of the album's cover and also on covers of its singles, plus on the cover of the single "Feel Me". Recently, from 2022, it has been used for the logo and identification graphics of VTV Can Tho, VTV's specific channel for the Southwest Region of Vietnam.

=== Computers and games ===
Digital Research used Friz Quadrata for its logo during much of the company's history. The Dell Computer Company used Friz Quadrata for its first logo from 1984 to 1990. The font can be seen in Blizzard Entertainment's 2002 RTS Warcraft III and 2004 MMORPG World of Warcraft to display character names and item information, as well as in the logo of the MOBA video game League of Legends up until 2019. A modified version is in the video-game series Fate. It was the primary typeface for Shadowrun role-playing game books from 1989 to 2013, except for the game's fourth edition in 2005, which employed Garamond Premier. It has been the title font for Vampire: The Masquerade from 1991 to present. It was the title font for Bungie's Pathways into Darkness and was the logo and heading font in the original printing of the Advanced Dungeons & Dragons 2nd edition role-playing game. It was used as the font for most text in the hit 2005 game Pathologic by game studio Ice-Pick Lodge.

=== Other ===
- Chiltern Railways used Friz Quadrata in its logo.
- Fast food chain KFC has used a modified version of Friz Quadrata for its logo since 1991.
- Hay House, the publishing company found by Louise Hay uses the font in its logo.
- Kronos Foods, a manufacturer/distributor of gyros and other Mediterranean foods in the United States, uses Friz Quadrata for its logo and branding. Many Greek restaurants in the United States display posters advertising Kronos' gyros that utilize the typeface.
- Philippine Daily Inquirer, the news publishing company used the font for its logo from 1994 to 2016.
- Mayora Indah, an Indonesian food and beverage manufacturer uses Friz Quadrata for its logo.
- Hero Supermarket (along with its parent company Hero Group), an Indonesian retailer, uses Friz Quadrata for its logo.
- Streetwear brand Anti Social Social Club uses Friz Quadrata for its logo and on its clothing.
- Moncler, a high-end fashion brand uses Friz Quadrata for its logo and it's clothing.
- The skateboard company Anti Hero utilized the typeface in one of the variations of its logo.
- Kirkland & Ellis LLP uses Friz Quadrata for its logo.
- SA Rugby uses Friz Quadrata Bold Italic along with the Springbok logo for all the South African rugby union teams.
- Mississippi Band of Choctaw Indians uses Friz Quadrata in The Tribal Logo (Eight-Beaded Chevron).
- Lapvona, the novel by Ottessa Moshfegh, uses Friz Quadrata on its cover.
- Grocery chain Safeway used Friz Quadrata for its logo from 1980 to 2005.
- An outline variant of Friz Quadrata was used by Oberheim on their synthesizers and various other products.
- American television network Fox used Friz Quadrata in logos and IDs of owned-and-operated stations from the network's launch in 1986 until 1993, yet some stations continued to use it in their logos afterwards.
- The Black Flag logo text is Friz Quadrata.

== Identifying characteristics ==
- Windswept appearance
- Distinct open bowls of lowercase letters, "6, 9"
- Short ascenders and descenders
- Curved stroke endings
