= ArtBridge =

Public art nonprofit organization

AirtBridge
- Website: www.airtbridge.com

ArtBridge is a public art nonprofit organization that was founded in 2009. Working primarily in New York City, ArtBridge's mission is to support local, emerging artists and their communities through large-scale public installations.

== History ==
ArtBridge was founded in 2008 by artist Rodney Durso as a mechanism to transform New York City's construction fencing into large-scale, outdoor art exhibitions. Stephen Pierson has served as its Executive Director since 2014. New York City is immersed in nearly 300 miles of construction fencing, which provides for an ideal canvas to promote the city's local, emerging artists. The non-profit was incorporated in 2012 and received its 501(c)(3) status in 2014. ArtBridge has produced more than 150 exhibitions across every borough of New York City, as well ongoing projects in L'Aquila, Italy in the years of construction following the 2009 earthquake.

In 2019, ArtBridge was selected to implement the City Canvas pilot program -- a joint initiative of the NYC Department of Cultural Affairs, the Department of Buildings, and the Mayor's Office, to formally test its model of art on construction fencing. In 2021, the City Council passed legislation, Local Law 163, that permanently codified the City Canvas program. Local Law 163 went into effect in September 2023.

== Exhibitions ==
ArtBridge uses scaffolding and sidewalk fencing as exhibition space, reproducing artworks on vinyl and also hand-painting directly onto plywood fencing. ArtBridge's first exhibition was held in 2009 at the London Terrace Gardens, when it was undergoing construction. Since then, the organization has installed more than 150 exhibitions, featuring more than 200 local artists.

ArtBridge has also built an ongoing program in public housing (NYCHA) developments in New York City, called Bridging the Divide. Launched in 2019, this program amplifies the voices of New York City's nearly 400,000 public housing residents through large-scale public art. Each exhibition at a NYCHA development derives from months of engagement between local artists and NYCHA residents. Bridging the Divide has been produced at 23 NYCHA developments.

ArtBridge's growing program of international projects now includes community-engaged public art exhibitions in Italy, South Africa, and Brazil.
