= ITC Anna =

- ITC Anna Standard Typeface Specimen
- Category: Display
- Designer: Daniel Pelavin
- Foundry: ITC
- Date created: 1991
- Re-issuing foundries: Linotype
- Shown here: ITC Anna Std

Anna is a geometric, Art Deco typeface created by Daniel Pelavin for ITC in 1991.

== History ==
Designer Daniel Pelavin started the design of Anna in the mid-1980s when he drew a few letters for an Aramis Cologne holiday promotion. He continued to use these letter for various projects, always adding new characters. The design became a family matter when Pelavin's wife, graphic designer Lorraine Louie, used the alphabet on their wedding invitation in 1988. They used it again for the birth announcement of their daughter, Anna, a year later.

It was alphabet Anna's appearance on Louie's business stationery that first brought the design to ITC's attention. In 1990, ITC asked Pelavin to develop a typeface based on the letterforms, and ITC Anna was released as a single design in 1991.

A couple of years later, Pelavin created a suite of swash and alternate characters for the design. Eventually, ITC asked Pelavin to draw a bold weight to complement the original release. ITC Anna Extended is the result.
