= Betti Broadwater Haft =

American graphic designer

- Born: January 4, 1933
- Died: August 1, 2021 (aged 88)

Betti Broadwater Haft (January 4, 1933 – August 1, 2021) was an American graphic designer. She was known as one of the few women who designed calligraphic letterforms for Photo-Lettering Inc (“PLINC”), a major typeface studio in New York City from 1936 to 1997.

== Early life and education ==
Haft was born in Lookout Mountain, Tennessee. Her family relocated to New York City in 1941 when she was eight years old. Haft attended Washington Irving High School on a vocational track and upon graduation was awarded a one-year scholarship to the Workshop School of Advertising Art. At the Workshop School, Haft's studies with Paul Standard launched her interest in calligraphy and letterform design. With Standard's encouragement Haft applied to and was accepted into Cooper Union’s certificate program, which was free of charge and ran its courses in the evenings.

== Career ==
While at Cooper, one of Haft's first full-time jobs was at the pharmaceutical advertising agency William Douglas McAdams. She then joined Will Burtin Incorporated in 1955. The agency was known as a meeting point for international artists, designers, and photographers including Andy Warhol, Burton Kramer, and Roman Vishniac.

In 1958, Georgine Oeri, one of Haft's mentors and the art consultant for the Swiss company Geigy Chemical Corporation recommended her for an in-house position directing design production at Geigy's new American base of operations in Ardsley, New York.

She is one of ten women among 252 letterers whose work is featured in the One Line Manual, a major typography reference for designers and art director, in 1971.

Haft later directed the communication department of College of Staten Island for 20 years.

=== Typefaces ===
A poster Haft designed for one of Burtin's clients, the United States Information Agency, was the starting point for her PLINC type family, Haft Grotesque Narrow (1963). Designed with a ruling pen (rather than with a brush), Haft considered her obround typeface a marriage of calligraphy and lettering.

== Personal life ==
Haft married Leon Haft in 1960. She had two children in 1963 and 1966.
