= Goudy Sans =

Humanist sans-serif typeface

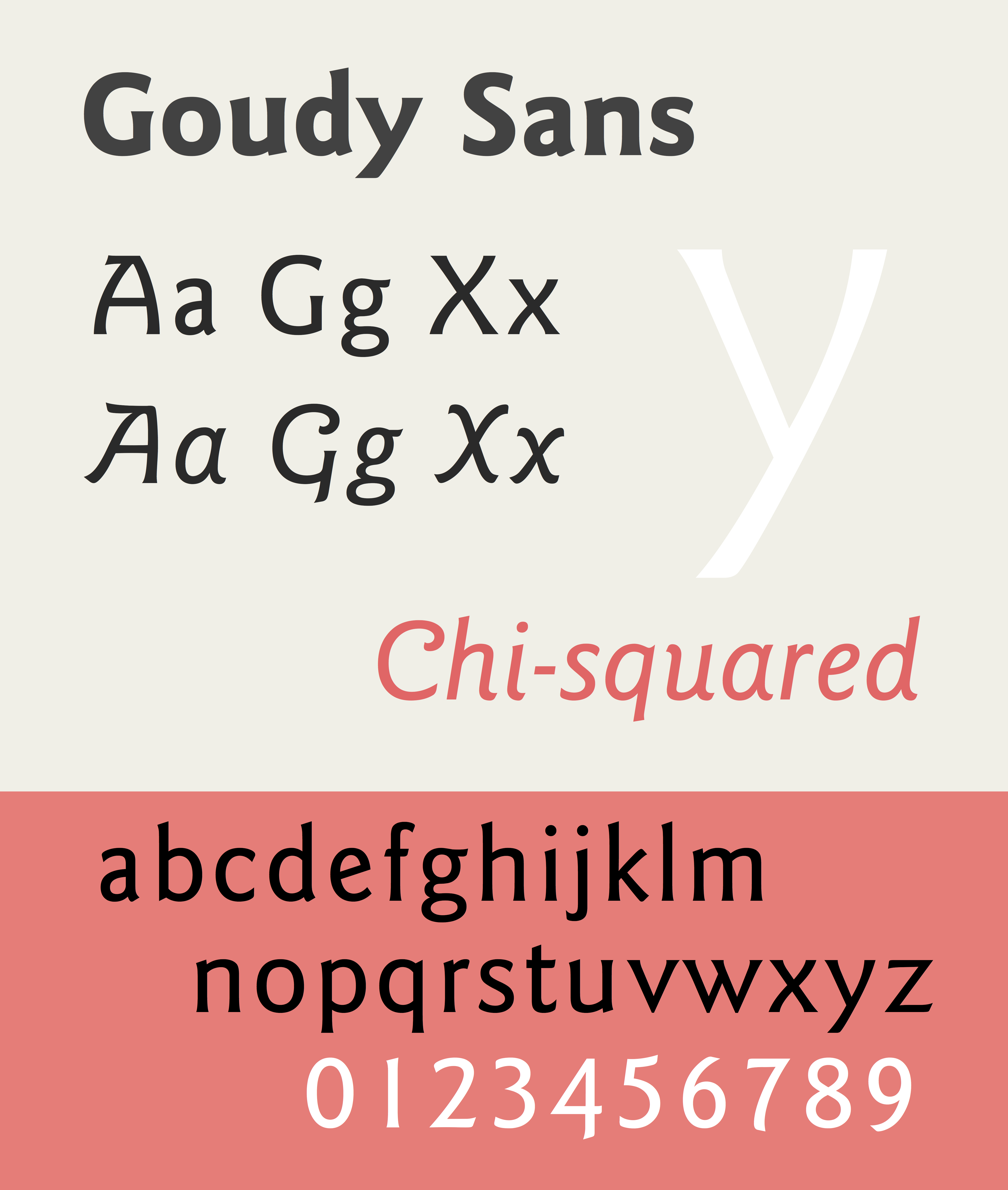
- Category: Sans-serif
- Classification: Humanist
- Designer(s): Frederic Goudy
- Foundry: Lanston Monotype; ITC
- Date created: 1929
- Variations: ITC Goudy Sans
- Also known as: Goudy Sans Serif

Goudy Sans is a sans-serif typeface designed by Frederic Goudy around 1929–1931 and published by Lanston Monotype.

Unlike many sans-serifs, which often have an unadorned appearance with a geometric or industrial aesthetic, Goudy Sans has a more organic and decorative structure resembling painted lettering, with flared stroke ends and an avoidance of straight lines, typifying Goudy's taste towards designs with an organic feel. Goudy added several complementary decorative alternate characters. Goudy drew a complementary italic with letterforms inspired by handwriting, decorative features such as swashes and curls, again with a number of decorative alternates. Lewis Blackwell in 20th-Century Type describes it as "something of a sport...with pronounced tendency to the inscriptional in its 'chiselled' junctions". The proportions of the lower-case are slightly condensed.

Goudy described the design as not popular in his lifetime and did not give it a specific name; it was published as "Goudy Sans Serif" in his lifetime. However, it has been re-released and digitised several times, mostly under the shortened name of Goudy Sans.

== Digitisations ==
Goudy Sans has been digitised by P22 under its LTC imprint in a version relatively similar to the original metal type. During the phototypesetting period of printing, Compugraphic developed a new version with adjusted proportions and an expanded range of weights. This was re-released and expanded by ITC to form a popular four-weight version, shown in the sample for this article. The ITC release was also re-released by Adobe.
