= ITC Benguiat =

1977 decorative serif typeface

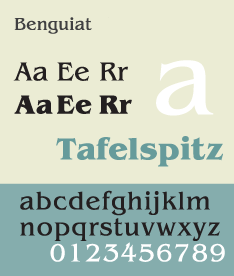
- Category: Serif
- Classification: Display
- Designer: Ed Benguiat
- Foundry: International Typeface Corporation
- Date created: 1977

ITC Benguiat is a decorative serif typeface designed by Ed Benguiat and released by the International Typeface Corporation (ITC) in 1977. The face is loosely based upon typefaces of the Art Nouveau period but is not considered an academic revival. The face follows ITC's design formulary of an extremely high x-height, combined with multiple widths and weights.

The original version of 1977 contained numerous nonstandard ligatures (such as AB, AE, AH, AK, AR, LA, SS, TT) and alternate shapes for some letters which were not carried into the digital version.

The font family consists of 3 weights at 2 widths each, with complementary italic.

It is also sold as 'Formal 832' by Bitstream.

== ITC Benguiat Pro ==
It is a version released in September 2008. It includes support for Central European and many Eastern European characters.

== ITC Benguiat Gothic ==
ITC Benguiat Gothic
- Category: Sans-serif
- Classification: Humanist
- Designer: Ed Benguiat
- Foundry: International Typeface Corporation (ITC)
- Date created: 1979

ITC Benguiat Gothic is a sans-serif variant for the original serif font family. Both faces are loosely based upon typefaces of the Art Nouveau period but are not considered academic revivals. The face follows ITC's design formulary of an extremely high x-height, combined with multiple widths and weights.

The font family consists of 4 weights at 1 width each, with complementary italic.

It is also sold as 'Informal 851' by Bitstream.

== Notable uses ==
The font is used on the covers of the original 1980s editions of Stephen King's novels, which inspired the logo for the show Stranger Things, as well as on the covers of the Choose Your Own Adventure series of books.

The font used by the rock band Greta Van Fleet, for The Smiths' album Strangeways, Here We Come, and for Logic's album Supermarket.

The font is used for many of filmmaker Quentin Tarantino's title sequences, such as in the actors' names in Pulp Fiction.

Benguiat is used in the main titles of Star Trek Generations and Star Trek: First Contact. It is also used in the video games The Chaos Engine and Nier: Automata. Benguiat Gothic is used in The Sims 2 and Boom Blox Bash Party.

It is also used by Amscot, a financial services company.

U2 used a modified version of Benguiat Gothic as the font for their 2026 album Carnaval de Luz.

== See also ==
- Korinna, a similarly styled typeface by Berthold
