= Miller & Richard =

Type foundry

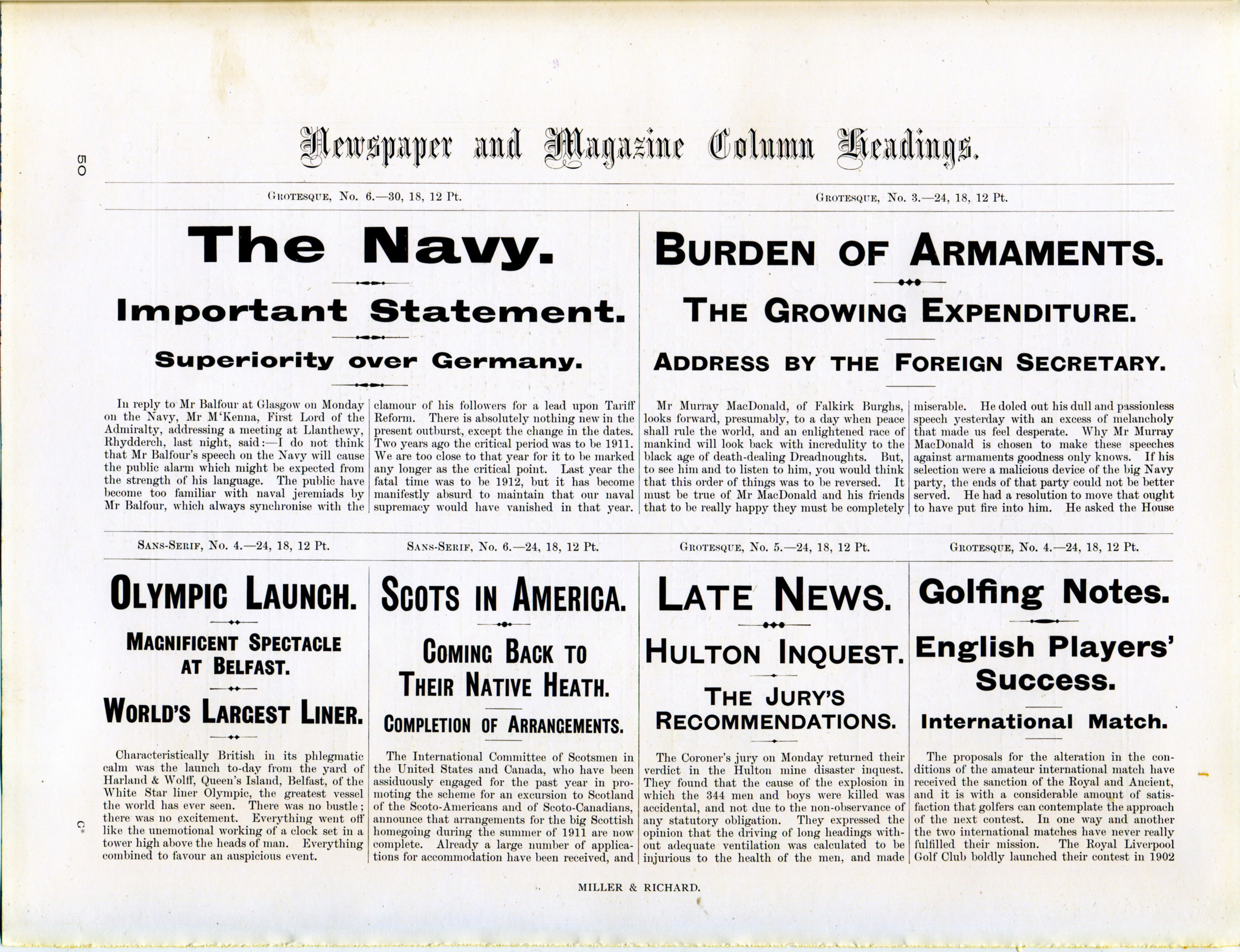
A specimen newspaper printed using Miller & Richard typefaces.

Miller & Richard was a type foundry based in Edinburgh that designed and manufactured metal type. It operated from 1809 to 1952.

The foundry was established by William Miller. He had been works manager of the foundry established by Alexander Wilson. Richard, his son-in-law was admitted as a partner in 1832. It was based in Reikie's Court off Nicolson Street.

One of the most notable sets of designs of the foundry was a "modernised old face" known as Old Style - an adaptation of the old-style serif fonts of the 1500-1800 period such as Caslon, but regularised to match the greater evenness and grace expected in fonts by the mid-nineteenth century. (Note: The date of this seems uncertain - Reed wrote of it dating from around 1844 in 1887, but other sources suggest much later - Mosley cites the earliest specimen as 1860 and the Edinburgh History of the Book also prefers a later date.) (Bookman Old Style is an extremely distant descendant of this style.) Its "Modern Face", a more geometric and 'classical' style of serif letter, was also popular and often copied. One of its punchcutters of the period was Alexander Phemister, who would later emigrate to the United States and cut "old style" designs there.

Talbot Baines Reed wrote in 1887 in his History of the Old English Letter Foundries that the foundry had also won a reputation for extremely small-size type for uses such as a French dictionary. As a specimen of this it issued a printing of Gray's Elegy, a poem of around 130 lines, in two columns with each column reduced to 3.75 inches in height.

The firm's work entered a decline with the arrival in the late nineteenth and early twentieth century of hot metal typesetting, by which type was not sold to printers but cast by machine new for each job, under the control of a keyboard. Some of its old style and modern typefaces were imitated by Monotype, one of the major hot metal companies. It was wound up in 1952. According to James Mosley "matrices for a few types were acquired by Stephenson, Blake & Co. Ltd., Sheffield, but most of the materials appear to have been dispersed."
