= Eras (typeface) =

Humanist sans-serif typeface

ITC Eras
- Category: Sans-serif
- Designers: Albert Boton; Albert Hollenstein
- Foundry: Linotype
- Date released: 1976

Eras is a humanist sans-serif typeface designed by Albert Boton and Albert Hollenstein and released by the International Typeface Corporation (ITC) in 1976. Eras is licensed by the Linotype type foundry.

A distinct and curious feature of Eras is its slight, 3-degree right tilt. Eras follows ITC's formulary of increased x-height, and multiple weights from light to ultra bold, though because all weights are slightly slanted, no italic version of the font is supplied. Eras is further distinct for its open bowls on the characters a, P, R, 6, and 9. The letter W changes shape from a merged 'double V' shape in the lighter variants to the standard W symbol in the bolder variants.

Four TrueType weights of this font (Light, Medium, Demi and Bold) are included with some editions of Microsoft Word, though not with the Windows operating system itself.

== Usage ==
The typeface has been widely used by Telecom Italia Mobile as a corporate typeface. TIM stopped use of Eras in 2016. It was also used in the emblem and image of the 1998 FIFA World Cup, in the credits for the movie Caddyshack and in the video games Tekken Tag Tournament, Jet Ion GP and Championship Manager 01/02. The American Broadcasting Company (ABC) network used the font in its on-air promotion graphics during the early to mid-1980s. A modified version of the font can be seen on the cover of Motörhead's 1981 album No Sleep 'til Hammersmith. The Stanley Kubrick movie Full Metal Jacket uses Eras typeface on the credits. Brazilian stock exchange Bovespa (now B3 S.A.) used the Eras typeface for its logo and tagline. A modified version of the font was used for the logo of game developer Spike (now Spike Chunsoft). Eras is the primary typeface of the Eugene Airport in Oregon. In 2006, Roblox once used the font, specifically the Demi weight for their ingame leaderboard.

The over-the-counter memory supplement Prevagen uses the Eras Light weight in its logotype.
