= Handel Gothic =

Geometric sans-serif typeface

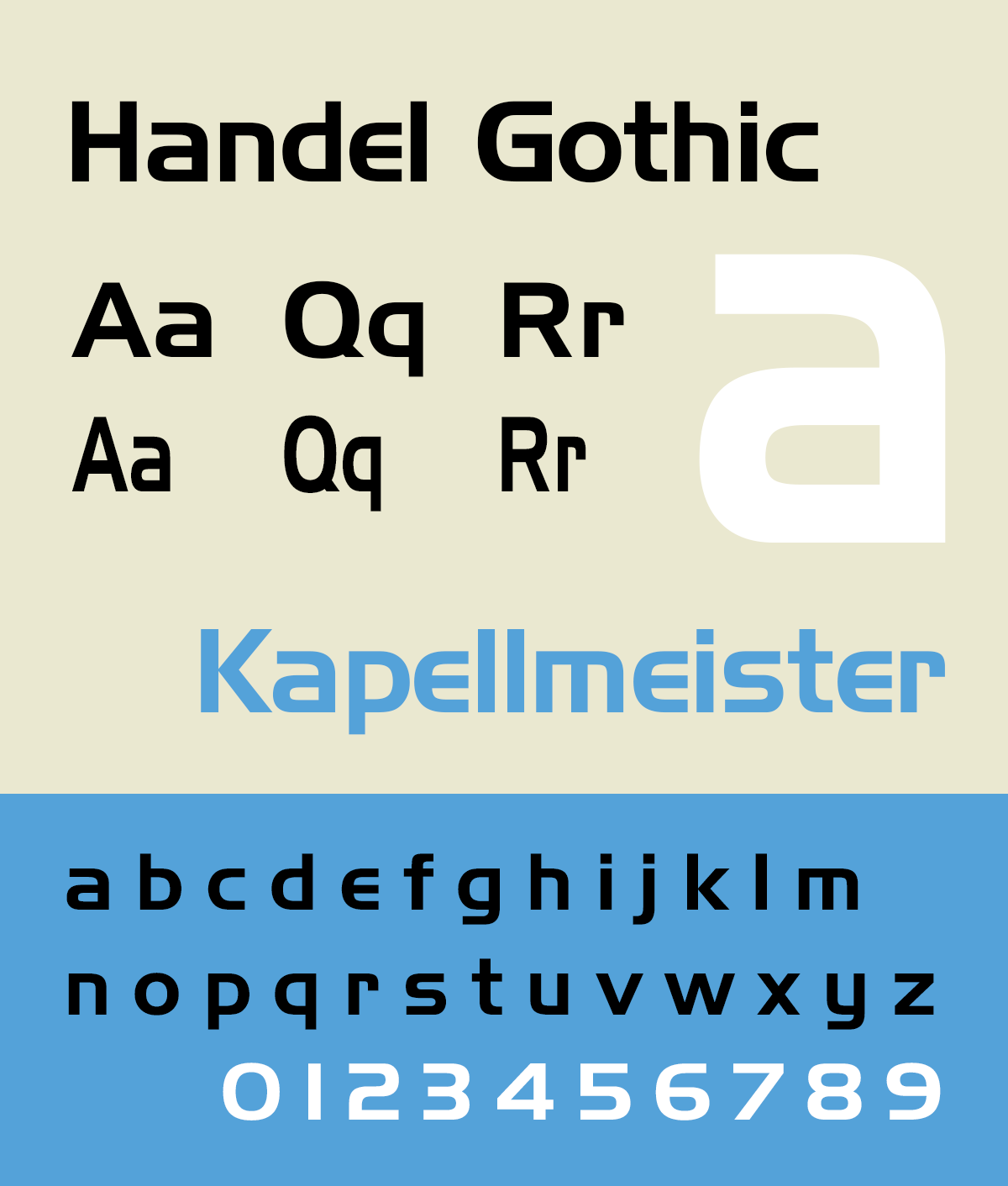
- Category: Sans-serif
- Classification: Geometric
- Designers: Donald J. Handel; Robert Trogman
- Foundry: FotoStar
- Date released: 1965
- Re-issuing foundries: Bitstream; Elsner+Flake; Linotype; Tilde SIA; URW++; ITC
- Variations: ITC Handel Gothic

Handel Gothic is a geometric sans-serif typeface designed in 1965 by Donald J. Handel (1936–2002), who worked for the graphic designer Saul Bass.

Handel Gothic was an instant success when first released. The typeface was originally distributed in film format by FotoStar and was reissued in the 1980s by Robert Trogman.

The typeface was popular in the 1980s, due to its futuristic design, and even today is used to signify the future; it has been used in the credits of both Star Trek: Voyager and Star Trek: Deep Space Nine as well as the logo for Close Encounters of the Third Kind and the menu text for the 2000 Nintendo 64 game Perfect Dark. Handel Gothic was widely used in the 2001 video game Halo: Combat Evolved, especially in its title screen and UI.

Handel Gothic was also used for the end credits on CBS' The Price Is Right from 1972–1981. Handel Gothic was also used for the end credits of Sesame Street (from 1983–1992). Handel Gothic was also used for the album cover of Jamiroquai's 1994 album The Return of the Space Cowboy. It was also the typeface of choice for designer Robert Dawson's title sequence for the 1984 science fiction film Trancers (1984), and more recently the credits font of Pixar's Elio (2025). A modified version of Handel Gothic was used for the logo of the second incarnation of Viacom from 2006 to 2019. Handel Gothic is also featured on all the Volvo cars.

The Elsner+Flake, Linotype and URW++ versions use a curved leg on uppercase R (like that of Helvetica), a horizontal tail on the uppercase Q (like that of Univers), a curved lower leg on the lowercase k, and a trident-like lowercase w.

The Bitstream and Tilde SIA versions, however, use a thicker 1, a straight leg on the uppercase R (like that of Akzidenz-Grotesk), a straight lower leg on the lowercase k, and a double-v w.

Christian Schwartz designed the Simian Display typeface, inspired from the Handel Gothic typeface, used by American science fiction media franchise Planet of the Apes and available in 3 weights named after primates ("Orangutan" for Regular, "Chimpanzee" for Bold, "Gorilla" for Black).

Thai type designer Anupap Jaichumnan designed the Flatory typeface, which also was inspired from the Handel Gothic typeface; it is available in four versions (sans-serif, serif, slab serif, high-contrast sans-serif).

== ITC Handel Gothic (2008) ==
It is a re-proportioned version designed by Rod McDonald, released in March 2008 by International Typeface Corporation.

The original release includes 5 fonts in 5 weights. OpenType features include fractions, ligatures, ordinals, stylistic alternates and subscript/superscript. Italic versions of the fonts were introduced with release of ITC Handel Gothic Pro.

=== ITC Handel Gothic Pro (2010) ===
It is a version of ITC Handel Gothic with complementary italic designs, support of Adobe Central Europe character set, addition of ligatures and alternate characters.

Additional OpenType features include localized forms, stylistic set 1.

== ITC Handel Gothic Arabic (2015) ==
It is a version of ITC Handel Gothic for Arabic, Persian and Urdu languages, designed by Nadine Chahine of Monotype Imaging, based on Kufic script.

The font family includes 5 fonts in 5 weights, without italics.

== URW++ Handel Slab (2009) ==
A slab-serif counterpart to URW++ Handel Gothic with three weights (Light, Medium, Bold) and obliques styles to complement them.

== Corporate identity uses ==
- 343 Industries, the current developer of the Halo video game franchise, have used Handel Gothic in their logo since their first game, Halo: Combat Evolved Anniversary, released in 2011. This follows the font being used in the first game in the Halo series, Halo: Combat Evolved (in menus in-game, and in the game's instruction manual), which was developed by Bungie and released in 2001.
- ADFC – Allgemeiner Deutscher Fahrrad-Club, the German NGO, supporting cycling, uses Handel Gothic as their corporate logo font.
- American Motors / AMC Eagle car model emblem from 1980 until 1987, used for the name of the car model EAGLE.
- Arkon Technologies – Handel Gothic Light
- Avery Corporation - used a custom treatment of the font for its Saul Bass-designed corporate identity from 1976 to 1988.
- Basic/Four Corporation
- Canal 10 Nicaragua – uses the font for the "canal" portion of the logo.
- Canon EOS autofocus photographic cameras line emblem since 1987, used for the name of the camera line EOS.
- CentOS, a Linux distribution, uses Handel Gothic in its logo.
- Cinemax Studios (now GMA Pictures) Used the font in 1997 until June 24, 1998
- Nvidia, logo font Handel Gothic, logo since 2006.
- Disney – The Walt Disney Company used Handel Gothic in the logo of The Disney Channel from 1983 to 1986. The font was also used on the Walt Disney Home Video logo Neon Mickey from 1981 to 1986 and the clamshells from Walt Disney Home Video usually from 1980 to early 1984. Additionally, it was featured on the 1971 to 1996 Walt Disney World logo with a Mickey silhouette within an oversized "D", as well as on signage within EPCOT Center prior to refurbishments.
- ERGO Grips - Currently uses Handel Gothic in its logo
- The Hoover Company – Used on its vacuum cleaners in the 1990s
- id Software's 2010 video game Quake Live uses Handel Gothic in its user interface.
- Robotnik Automation – uses Handel Gothic in their logo.
- Jaycar – Used in its logo since 2019
- Korean Broadcasting System- used Handel Gothic for company's logo from 1984.
- Magyar Televízió used a modified version of the font in its logos from 2002 until 2012.
- Mega (Chilean TV channel) – used Handel Gothic for its news division in the early 2000s. Additionally, his newscast program Meganoticias used Handel Gothic in their logo from 2000 until 2010.
- Metro TV (Indonesia) Used this font in logo since 2010.
- NEEWER - Currently uses Handel Gothic in its logo
- Paris Football Club uses this font on their crest.
- Pepsi - several of Pepsi's logos featured this font, beginning with Diet Pepsi in 1986, and spreading to the main brand by 1987. It would survive three rebrands before being phased out in 2003.
- PHP, a general-purpose scripting language, uses Handel Gothic in its logo.
- Rogue Fitness uses this font in its logo
- San Miguel Corporation uses Handel Gothic as their corporate logo font since 1975.
- News Patrol, a newscast in the ABS-CBN News Philippines, used this logo font from 2008 to 2013.
- TV Patrol, a newscast in the Philippines, used this font from 2001 to 2022.
- Huawei, logo font Handel Gothic, logo 2006 to 2018.
- United Airlines – In 1973 Saul Bass developed the United logo that featured a customized red and blue "Double U" logo and underneath Handel Gothic logotype.
- Univision – Has used the font for its graphics packages during the early 2000s.
- University of Oregon uses a modified form of Handel Gothic for its logo and branding.
- Volvo – has used the font since 1974. Initially, it was used for the model badges on its cars, but this application ceased in the early 1980s when it began to be used for the instrument panel and dashboard graphics, where it has been applied ever since.
- Viacom – The second incarnation of Viacom’s logo used this font, said incarnation lasted from 2005-2019.
- WWF SmackDown! used it for the first two years of the show, as the nameplate font for wrestlers, commentators and other various graphics from 1999 to 2001.
- ZDF (Zweites Deutsches Fernsehen) – German national public television broadcaster's logo.
- Sony Ericsson used this font in own logo in 2001–2011
- Kompas TV
- United States Department of Defense - Used on certain designs for the Meal, Ready-to-Eat packages.
