= Hugh Williamson (book designer) =

British book designer and author

Hugh Williamson (16 November 1918, Manchester – 30 October 1992, Oxford) was a British book designer and author on printing. Williamson dropped out of University College London to serve in the Royal Artillery on the Italian front during the Second World War, and later wrote an unofficial history of his Fourth Division.

After studying at the London College of Printing he became a staff designer for Oxford University Press where he wrote the textbook Methods of Book Design. He was editor of the Bulletin of the British Printing Historical Society from 1980 to 1988. Wiliamson's uncle was Tom Wintringham.
