= Ed Benguiat =

American type designer (1927–2020)

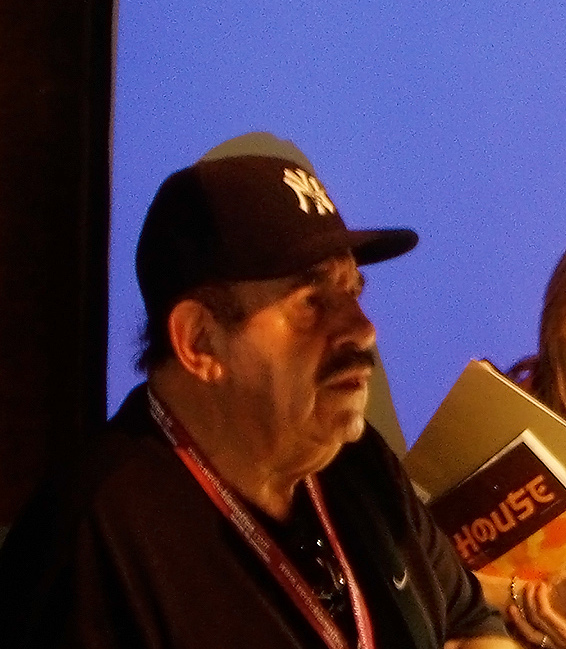
- Benguiat in 2008
- Born: Ephram Edward Benguiat; October 27, 1927; Brooklyn, New York, U.S.
- Died: October 15, 2020 (aged 92); Cliffside Park, New Jersey, U.S.
- Occupations: Graphic designer, type designer
- Spouse: Elisa Benguiat

Ephram Edward Benguiat (/ˈbɛnɡæt/; October 27, 1927 – October 15, 2020) was an American type designer and lettering artist. He designed over 600 typefaces, including Tiffany, Bookman, Panache, Souvenir, Edwardian Script, and the eponymous Benguiat and Benguiat Gothic.

He was also known for his designs or redesigns of the logotypes for Esquire, The New York Times, Playboy, McCall’s, Reader’s Digest, Photography, Look, Sports Illustrated, The Star-Ledger, The San Diego Tribune, AT&T, A&E, Coke, Estée Lauder, Ford, and others. Other notable examples of Benguiat’s work are the logotypes for the original Planet of the Apes film, Super Fly and The Guns of Navarone, and the typeface for the opening credits for Stranger Things.

== Early life ==
Benguiat was born in Brooklyn, New York, on October 27, 1927, to Rose Nahum and Jack Benguiat. His mother was a driver with the Red Cross, and his father was a display director in the department store chain Bloomingdale's. He was exposed to design elements as early as nine, with access to his father's design tools.

Although he was not old enough to enlist for the armed forces during World War II, he enlisted using a forged birth certificate and served in the Air Corps. He was stationed in Italy as a radio operator, and later performed photo reconnaissance.

== Career ==
Benguiat started out his career as a jazz percussionist playing in bands with the likes of Stan Kenton and Woody Herman. In an interview, he stated of his chosen career as a designer: "I’m really a musician, a jazz percussionist. One day I went to the musician’s union to pay dues and I saw all these old people who were playing bar mitzvahs and Greek weddings. It occurred to me that one day that’s going to be me, so I decided to become an illustrator."

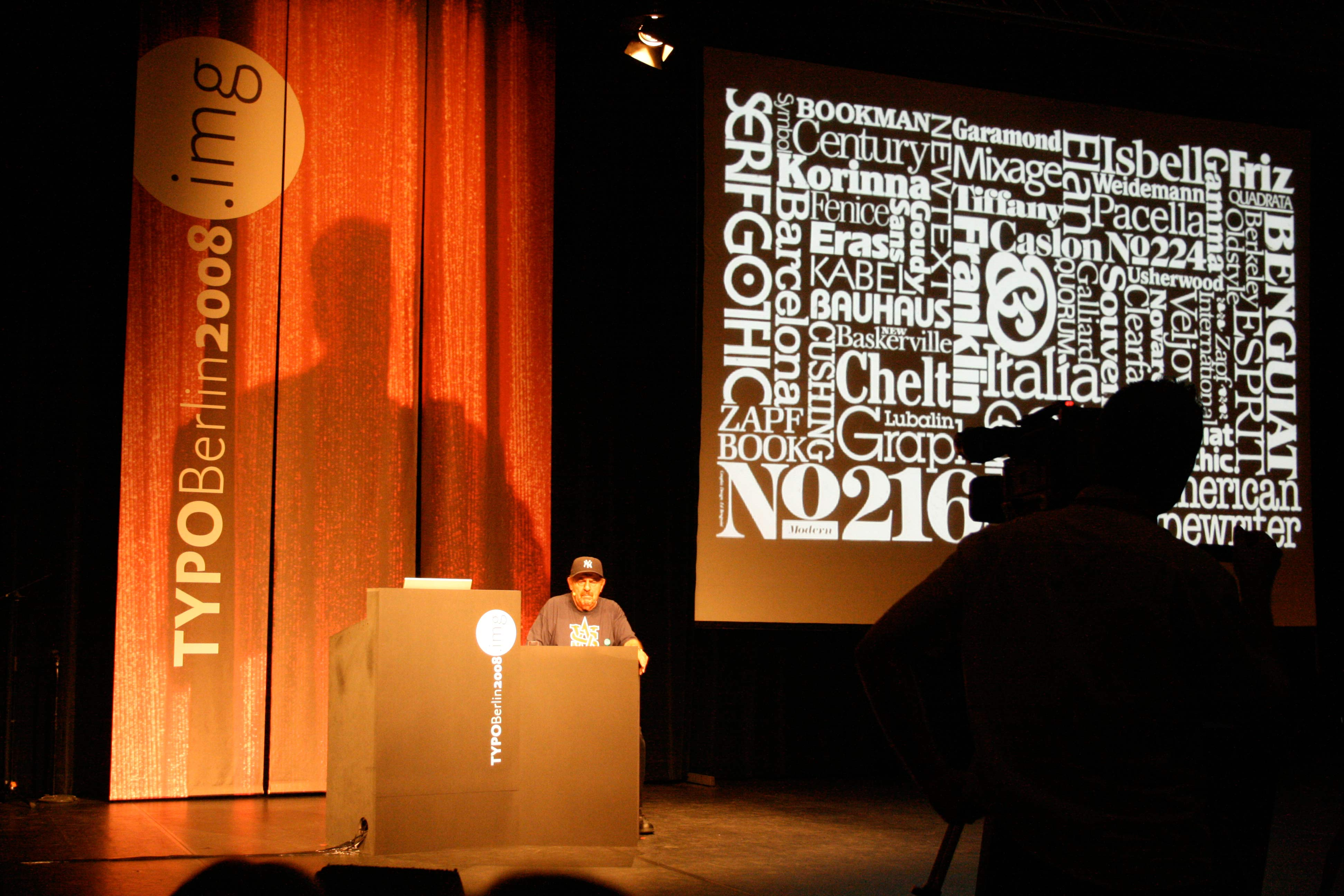
Ed Benguiat standing in front of a graphic of some of his typefaces at a talk in Berlin, 2008

He started his design career by working, in his words, as a "cleavage retoucher" during the restrictive period after World War II, when the Hays Code imposed restrictions on nudity in motion pictures. His role involved airbrushing and other techniques to do away with nudity in published works. He went on to study graphical design, calligraphy, and typography at the Workshop School of Advertising Art under the Russian-American graphical artist and calligrapher Paul Standard.

He was hired as a designer by Esquire magazine in 1953 and subsequently went on to join Photo Lettering Inc. as a design director in 1962. It was here that he worked on utilizing photo technology for commercial typography and lettering. He helped set up the International Typeface Corporation (ITC) in 1970, as an independent licensing company and served as a vice president.

Over his career, he was one of the most prolific lettering artists, crafting over 600 typeface designs including Tiffany, ITC Bookman, Panache, Souvenir, Edwardian Script, and the eponymous Benguiat and Benguiat Gothic. His Benguiat family was considered synonymous with Stephen King's works in the 1980s, and used in the logo and opening credits of Stranger Things. It was also used for the main credits in Star Trek Generations and Star Trek: First Contact.

He was also known for his designs or redesigns of the logotypes for Esquire, The New York Times, Playboy, McCall’s, Reader’s Digest, Photography, Look, Sports Illustrated, The Star-Ledger, The San Diego Tribune, AT&T, A&E, Coke, Estée Lauder, Ford, and others. Other notable examples of Benguiat’s work are the logotypes for the original Planet of the Apes film, Super Fly and The Guns of Navarone. His "Benguiat Caslon" was used in the logo of Foxy Brown.

Benguiat's design aesthetic included dramatic display typefaces, tight spacing, also known as "tight but not touching" or "sexy spacing", and the very high x-heights popular in design in the 1970s, sometimes with flamboyant swashes, all features which were common in ITC's typefaces. These styles are also seen in the design of Herb Lubalin, another of ITC's co-founders. Gene Gable commented "You could easily say that ITC designs put a face on the ’70s and ’80s...You couldn’t open a magazine or pass a billboard in the ’70s without seeing [them]."

Benguiat was a teacher at the School of Visual Arts, in New York, starting in 1961 and serving for over 50 years. He was inducted into the Art Directors Hall of Fame in 2000.

== Personal life ==
Benguiat was married to Elisa (née Halperin) Benguiat for 38 years until his death. He died on October 15, 2020, twelve days before his 93rd birthday, at his home in Cliffside Park, New Jersey.

He was an avid hobby pilot and was a member of a flying club called 'The Flying Birdmen'.

== Published fonts ==
Most of Benguiat's published work was released through International Typeface Corporation. This includes ITC Barcelona, ITC Benguiat, ITC Benguiat Gothic, ITC Bookman, ITC Caslon No. 224, ITC Century Handtooled, ITC Edwardian Script, ITC Modern No. 216, ITC Panache, ITC Souvenir, ITC Tiffany. In addition, there were collaboration releases including ITC Avant Garde (condensed styles only), ITC Bauhaus (with Victor Caruso), ITC Cheltenham Handtooled (with Tony Stan), ITC Korinna (with Victor Caruso), ITC Lubalin Graph (with Herb Lubalin).

=== Ed Benguiat Collection ===
The Ed Benguiat Font Collection is a casual font family designed by Benguiat and released by House Industries. The collection includes a series of whimsical icons, dubbed "bengbats". Unlike Benguiat's earlier, pre-computer work, the family uses extensive OpenType programming to replicate the feel of custom lettering or manual phototypesetting, similar to classic film posters and record sleeves. Some of the fonts in this collection included Ed Brush, Ed Gothic, Ed Interlock, Ed Roman, Ed Script, PL Benguiat Frisky.
