= Mark Simonson =

American type designer (born 1955)

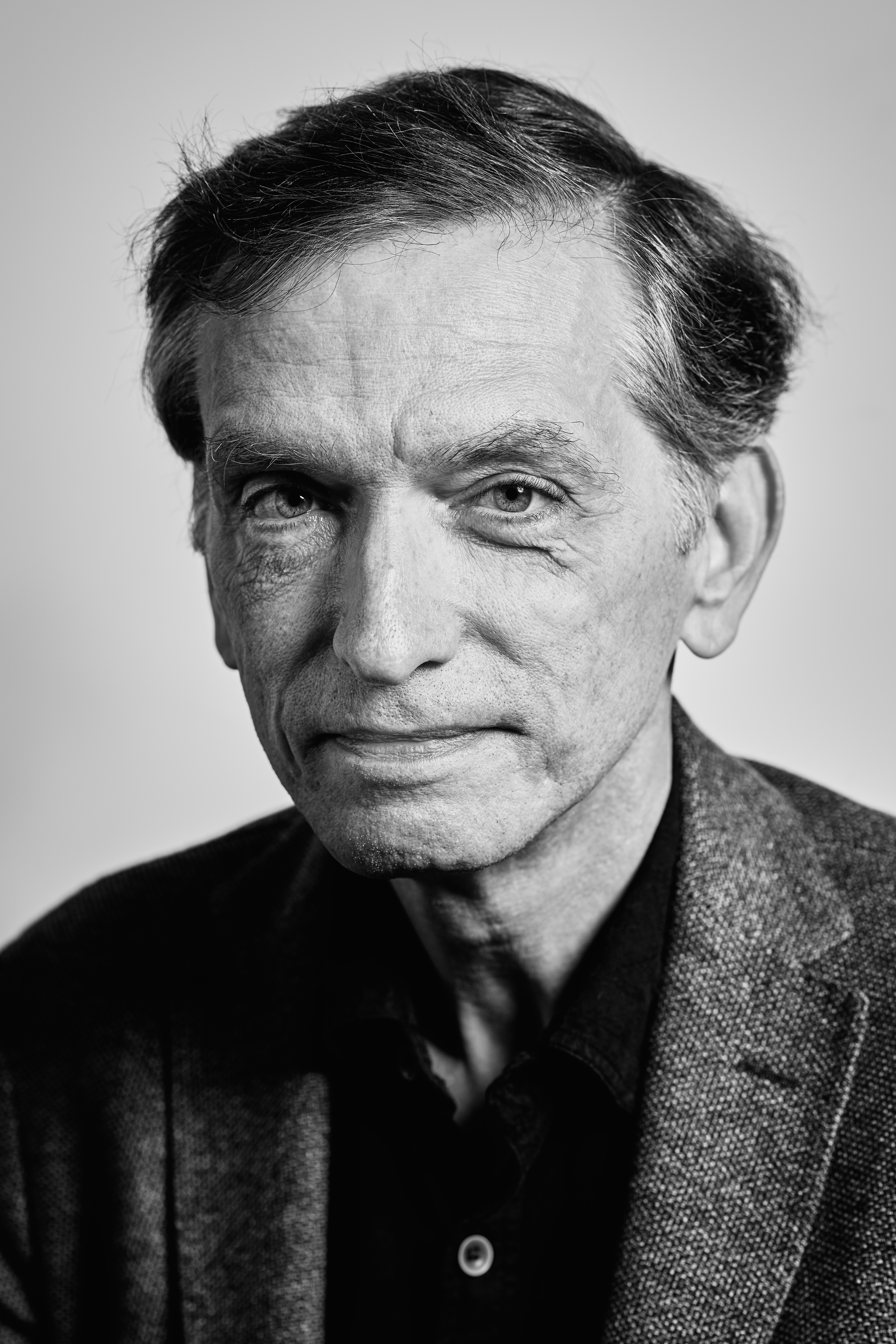
- Simonson in 2018
- Born: 1955 (age 69–70); Wisconsin, US
- Occupation: Type designer
- Notable work: Proxima Nova

Mark Simonson (born 1955) is an American independent type designer who works in St. Paul, Minnesota.

== Career ==
Simonson has described his typefaces as often being inspired by lettering styles of the past, such as the graphic design of the 1970s, Art Deco graphics and wood type.

Simonson’s most popular font family is Proxima Nova (1994, revised 2005), a sans-serif design in the geometric and grotesque styles used by companies such as BuzzFeed, Mashable, NBC, The Onion, TikTok and Wired. As of October 2021, it is the fifth highest-selling family on font sales website MyFonts. His fonts also include Anonymous Pro, a monospaced font designed for programming released under the OFL.

Simonson worked as a graphic designer before specializing in type design. His career as a type designer got a boost when his partner Pat won money on the game show Who Wants to Be a Millionaire, as her success allowed him to take six months off from graphic design work to design several new typefaces that he could sell. He has also written blog articles on the history of type design and the lettering styles used in films, including the type blog Typographica.
