= Kronos Foods =

Kronos Foods, Inc., is a Chicago-based company which is a foodservice manufacturer of Mediterranean food in the United States and the largest manufacturer of gyros in the world. Kronos Foods is known for being one of the first to produce, standardize, and market gyro cones (an argument exists as to who exactly was the first to "invent" the first manufactured gyro cone). They also produce marketing for gyro consumption. With over 200 employees at its factory in Glendale Heights, Illinois, Kronos has expanded its product line from just gyro meats in the late 1970s to Greek yogurt, pita, hummus, spanakopita, baklava, and other Mediterranean foods.

== History ==
Chris Tomaras started Kronos in 1975. It was sold to a private equity firm in 1994. It is located in Glendale Heights, Illinois. Tomaras was considered to be an entrepreneur from Chicago, Illinois.

== Products ==
The purpose of the company is to provide gyro ingredients so their customers can gain customers. Kronos produces meat, dairy, bakery, fillo appetizers, and dessert products. Kronos Foods distributes their products nationally through food service channels, major retailers, broadline and specialty distributors, club stores, mass merchants, and grocery chains.
