= ITC Kahana =

- Category: Sans serif decorative
- Designer(s): Teri Kahan
- Date created: 2004

ITC Kahana is a sans serif decorative typeface created in 2004, based on Polynesian text. It was created by the designer Teri Kahan while living in Hawaii.

Its bold verticals are intended to symbolically convey the power and strength of the Polynesian people.

In Hawaiian, "kaha" means “to mark, draw, place, turn or surf” and “na” means “belonging to”.
