= Edward Rondthaler =

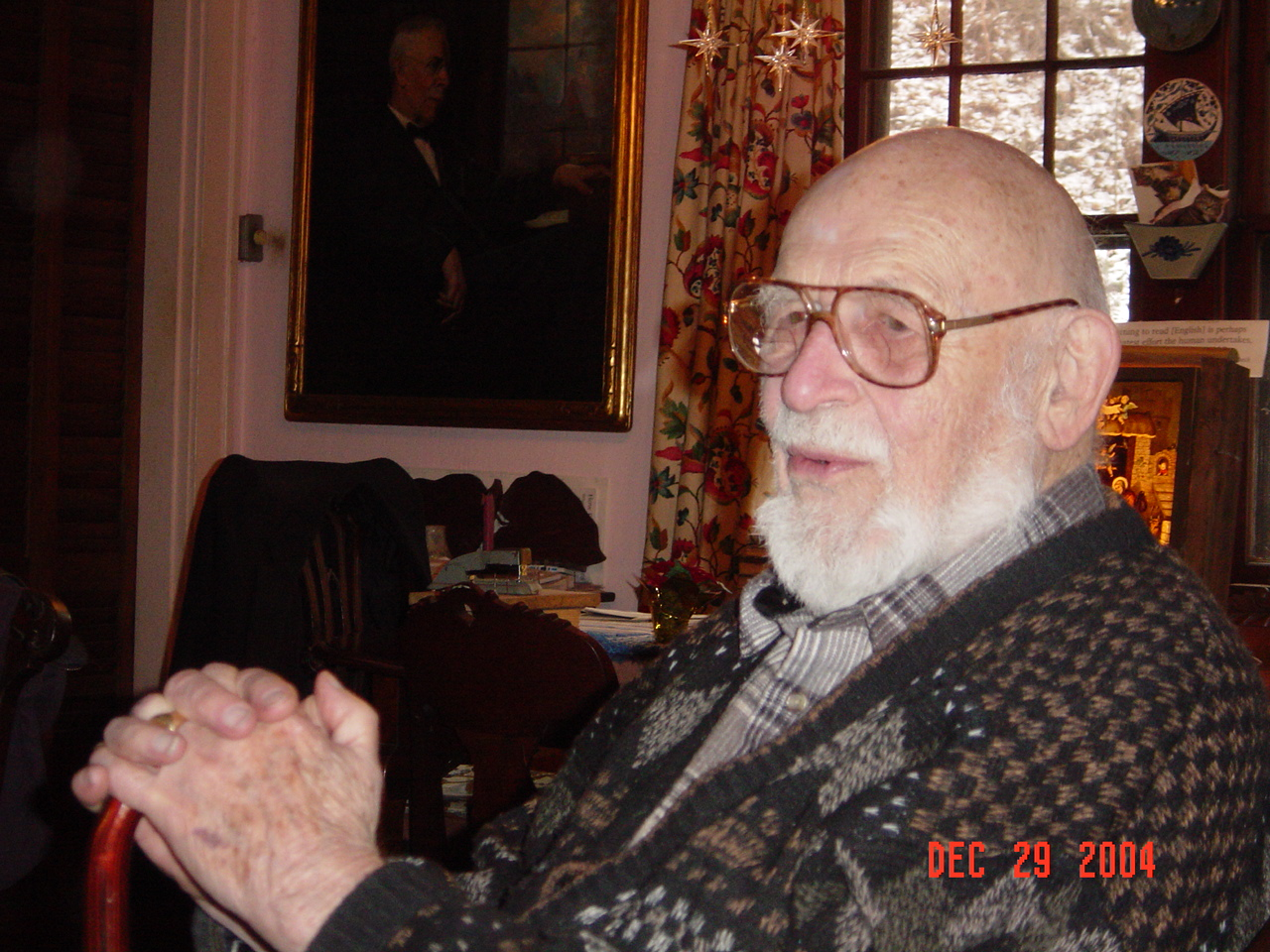
- Rondthaler in 2004
- Born: June 9, 1905; Bethlehem, Pennsylvania, United States
- Died: August 19, 2009 (aged 104); Cedar City, Utah
- Other names: Ed Rondthaler, Uncle Ed
- Education: University of North Carolina at Chapel Hill
- Known for: typography, English spelling reform
- Spouse: Dorothy Reid (m. 1930)
- Children: 3 sons
- Parent(s): Howard Rondthaler, Katherine Boring
- Relatives: Rev. Edward Rondthaler (grandfather)

Dr. Edward Rondthaler (June 9, 1905 – August 19, 2009) was a typographer as well as a simplified spelling champion and chairman of the American Literacy Council. He was critical to the development of SoundSpel. He was born in Bethlehem, Pennsylvania. A longtime resident of Croton-on-Hudson, New York, Rondthaler became a centenarian in 2005.

== Personal life ==
Edward Rondthaler was the son of Howard Rondthaler, a Moravian bishop and president of Salem College in Winston-Salem, North Carolina, and his wife Katharine Boring, the daughter of a Philadelphia pharmacist. His grandfather (Rev. Edward Rondthaler) was a Moravian church bishop. Rondthaler spent his youth in Salem, North Carolina.

Rondthaler married Dorothy ("Dot") Reid in 1930. They were married for 72 years up until her death in 2002. The Rondthalers had 3 sons.

== Typography and Spelling Reform ==
Rondthaler received his first small printing press at the age of 5, which began his career in the graphic arts. Working in New York in the 1930s, he associated with Harold Horman of the Rutherford Machinery Co. Together, they adapted a step-and-repeat machine (for texture and metal printing) for photographic lettering, and in 1936 founded and was later President Emeritus of Photo-Lettering, Inc.

In 1969, Rondthaler, Aaron Burns, and Herb Lubalin founded the International Typeface Corporation. For several decades, ITC furnished manufacturers with photographic, electronic, and laser equipment and a plethora of typefaces.

Later in life, Rondthaler became interested in promoting English spelling reform, and more specifically SoundSpel, as a means of fighting illiteracy. In 1986, he and Edward Lias released the Dictionary of simplified American Spelling, which outlined much of what would become SoundSpel. The book writes that "[h]e forsees [sic] that much of what has been achieved in typesetting modernization can now be utilized to bring about equally significant and beneficial changes in our [English] orthography." Rondthaler was also an avid historian.

== Longevity ==
Rondthaler credited his long and healthy life to clean living, good genes, and regular cold showers. In an interview with CNN, he said "When my brother in 1918 came home from the army, he said, 'Ed, whenever you take a hot shower, end it with an ice-cold one and count to 100.' When your older brother tells you to do something, you do it."

Rondthaler wrote a weekly letter to the editor of the local newspaper. Formerly very active in his community, for health reasons he moved to Utah in 2008 to be closer to his family. He died of natural causes in Cedar City, Utah on August 19, 2009, at the age of 104.

== Commercials ==
Since turning 100, Rondthaler had been featured in a number of commercials which have led to his most recent prominence.

- Featured in Genworth Financial 100 + stories ad campaign.
- Featured in Pearle Vision I Have Seen ad campaign.
- Featured in House Industries House Industries Presents Ed Rondthaler ad campaign.

== See also ==
- Orthography
- Spelling reform
- SoundSpel
- List of reforms of the English language
- "The Chaos" (poem demonstrating irregular English spelling)
- Betti Broadwater Haft
