= Karnak (typeface) =

Slab serif typeface

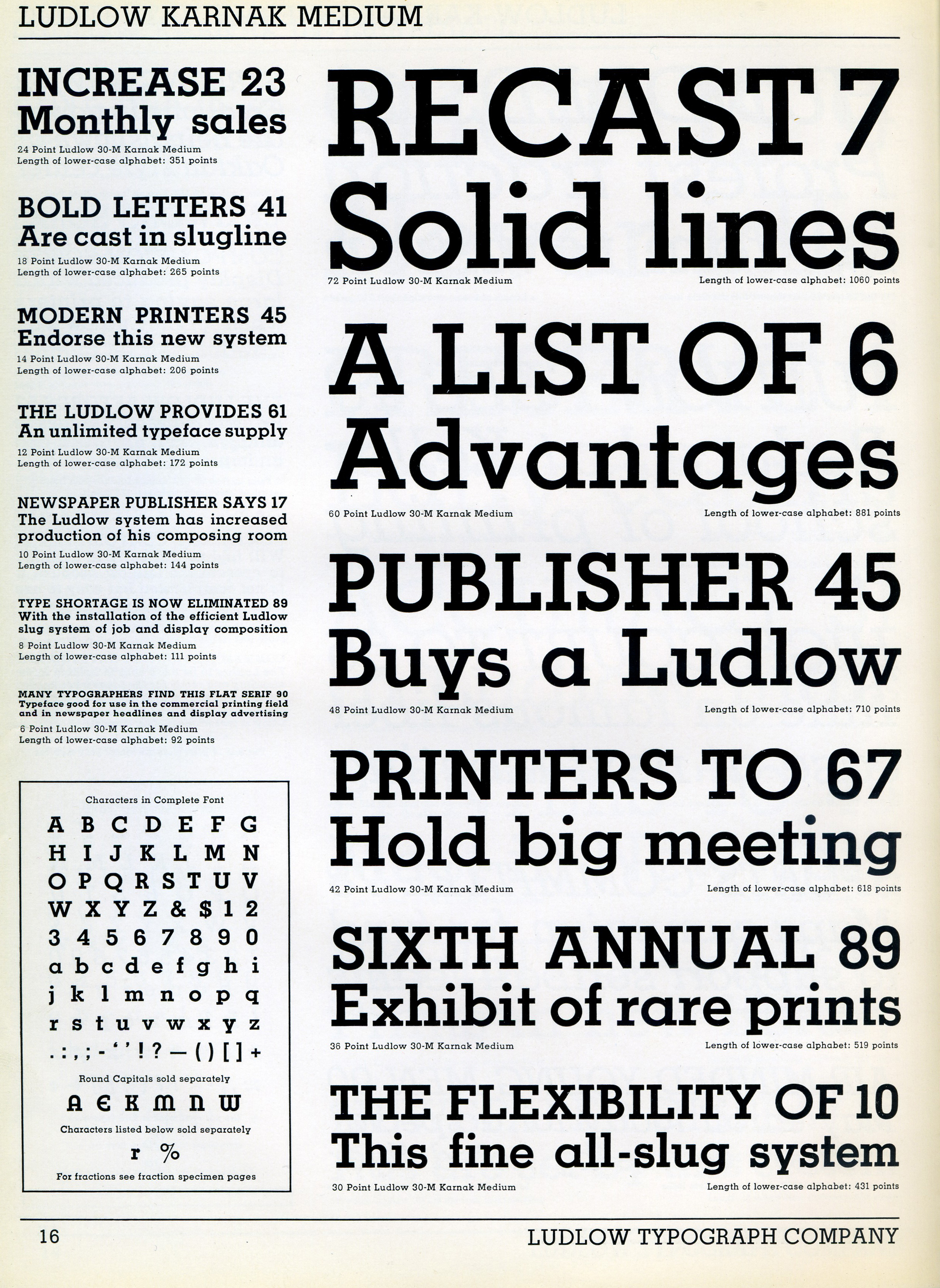
Karnak Medium in metal type

Karnak is a slab-serif typeface designed by R. Hunter Middleton for the Ludlow Typograph company and issued in the period 1931–1942.

Karnak is a "geometric" slab serif, reflecting the style of German geometric sans-serifs (in particular Futura) which had attracted considerable attention in the United States and adapting the design to the slab serif structure. It copies the German geometric slab-serif Memphis. Middleton also designed a loose copy of Futura, the sans-serif Tempo, around the same time. It and other similar designs were popular in American printing during the hot metal typesetting period.

Like Memphis, Karnak's name, after the Karnak Temple Complex in Egypt, references the fact that early slab serifs were often called "Egyptians" as an exoticism by nineteenth-century typefounders. (Note: Although, confusingly, the term was first used to refer to sans-serifs, and the earliest slab-serifs were often called "Antiques".)

Karnak was an influence on the design of the popular 2009 slab serif Neutraface Slab. It is an adaptation of the sans-serif Neutraface designed by Christian Schwartz, influenced by Middleton's Tempo. Archer is another well-known modern geometric slab serif in this style with a less strictly geometric design.
