= Legibility Group =

Series of serif typefaces intended for use in newspapers

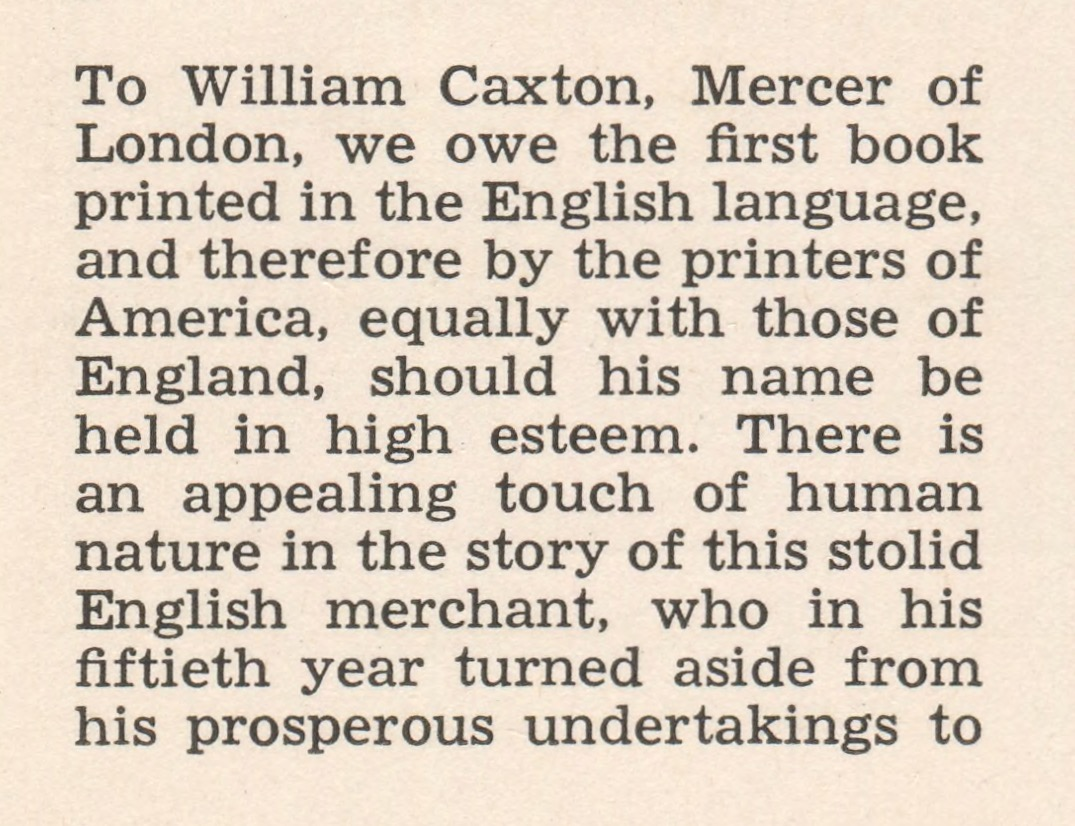
Sample of Linotype Textype, a Legibility Group typeface

The Legibility Group is a series of serif typefaces created by the American Mergenthaler Linotype Company and intended for use in newspapers on Linotype's hot metal typesetting system. They were developed in-house by Linotype's design team, led by Chauncey H. Griffith, and released from 1925, when the first member, Ionic No. 5, appeared.

Griffith's aim with the Legibility Group typefaces was to create a design with more body than the rather spindly Didone typefaces previously standard in newspaper printing. To this end, the designs have low contrast in stroke weight, wide open counters and ball terminals, intended to make the letters clearly distinguishable even when printed on poor-quality newsprint paper.

The Legibility Group typefaces were extremely popular and remained used by many newspapers worldwide throughout the metal type period and beyond; many other newspaper typefaces from other foundries such as Intertype were created based on their design. A notable exception is Monotype's Times New Roman, which was created to take advantage of the unusually high standard of printing of the Times in the 1930s. (Note: Times New Roman's bold weight, however, is more similar to the Legibility Group style.) In 1972, British printing manager Allen Hutt commented that "the majority of the world's newspapers are typeset in one or another of the traditional Linotype 'Legibility Group', and most of the rest in their derivatives."

== Typefaces ==
The family became a large group due to the creation of slightly different designs for different printing conditions, such as levels of inking used in different newspaper production processes and versions with different x-heights. (Note: A modern method similar to this is font grades, different designs of digital font intended to compensate for different amounts of ink spread.) Linotype carried out a survey of optometrists as part of their research process.

- Ionic No. 5 — the first in the family and extremely successful. Sometimes criticised for having too high an x-height, making lower-case letters very wide and reducing the difference between an "n" and an "h". Bitstream Inc.'s News 701 typeface is an unofficial digitisation.
- Textype — similar but with a lower x-height, giving a more delicate structure with more contrast between letters with and without ascenders.
- Excelsior — reduced x-height and intended for rubber-roller presses. Linotype has described its use as most common "in Europe, where newspaper columns are wide."
- Opticon — heavier, to compensate for printing that deliberately underinks to favour halftones.
- Paragon — lighter, to compensate for newspapers that deliberately overink to favour text and headlines.
- Corona (Note: Not to be confused with the script typeface Coronet.) — condensed and large on the body. Walter Tracy praised it for carrying "the design of newspaper types to a new level."

Although not part of the family, Linotype marketed its sans-serif family Metro and slab serif face Memphis as effective complements for headings.

== Design style ==
A "modern" or Didone font of the nineteenth century with three derivatives. At the bottom, Haas Clarendon shows reduced contrast and a wide, display-oriented structure. The text faces Century Schoolbook and especially Linotype Excelsior, a variant on Linotype Ionic, have text-oriented structures with narrower letterforms and smaller serifs than the Clarendon, but they show reduced contrast and more open letterforms to increase legibility compared to the Modern, particularly visible on Excelsior's "e", "c" and "a". (Note: The Modern face would not have seemed so high in contrast in print at small sizes. (For specimen images of these faces in metal type, see Hutt.))

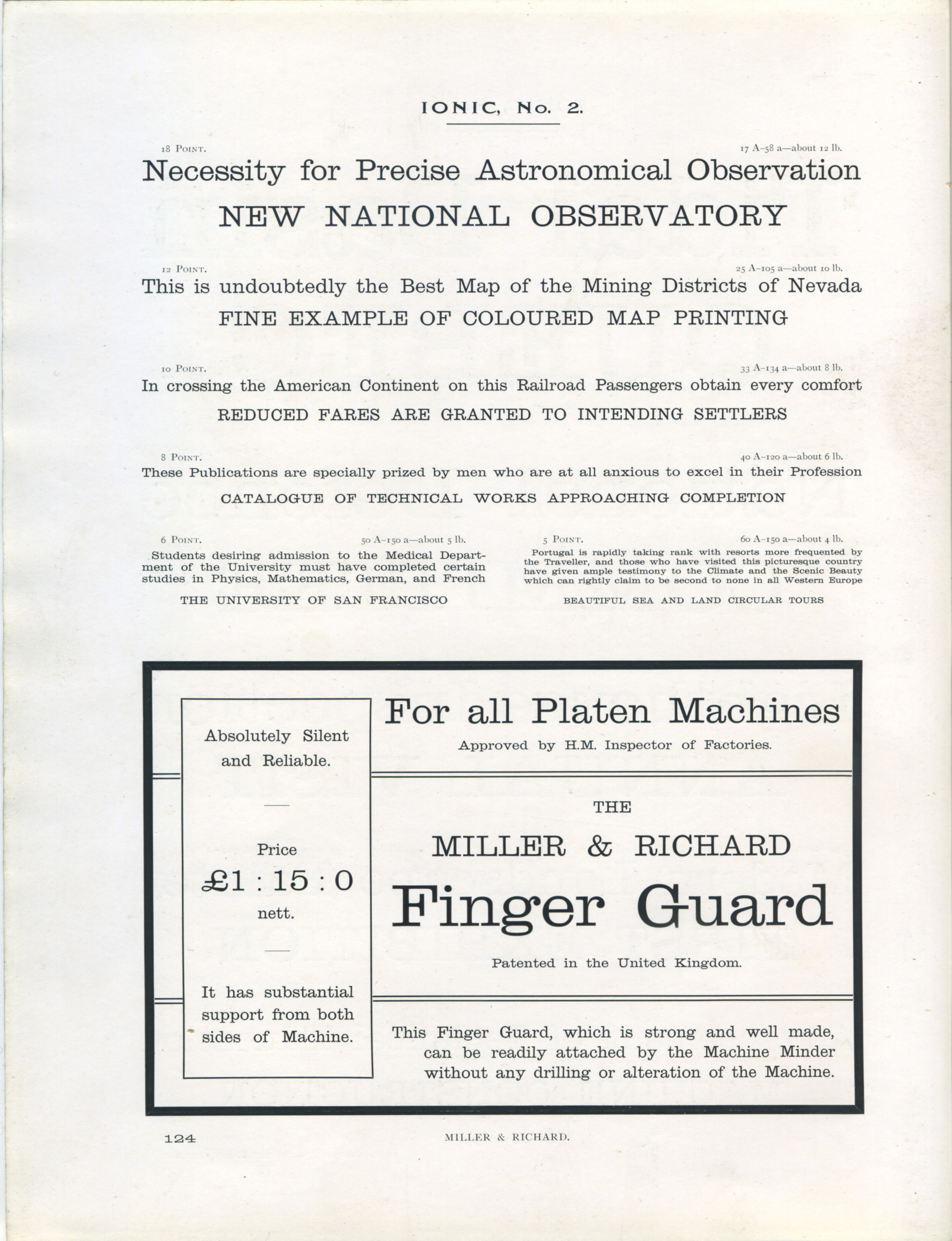
Miller and Richard's Ionic No. 2 typeface of the nineteenth century.

The Legibility Group faces resemble the "modern" or Didone faces of the nineteenth century, with ball terminals, a curled leg on the "R" and a looped "Q". However, stroke contrast is limited and the apertures are held wide open to clearly differentiate letters.

As the name "Ionic No. 5" suggests, the "legibility group" typefaces resembled slab serif typefaces of the nineteenth century, variously called "Clarendon" or "Ionic", but it is modified from these to have a build suitable for body text. Hutt suggests that the design was based on the popular family of the name Ionic from Miller & Richard and copies from other foundries, slightly bolder than was considered normal for body text during the late nineteenth century. G. Willem Ovink, however, has argued that a more direct influence (although not on the italic) was American Type Founders' Century Expanded, also a Didone face with reduced contrast, but that Linotype were unwilling to admit any influence from a competitor's work and so chose a name suggesting a more distant inspiration.
