= Tempo (typeface) =

Geometric sans-serif typeface

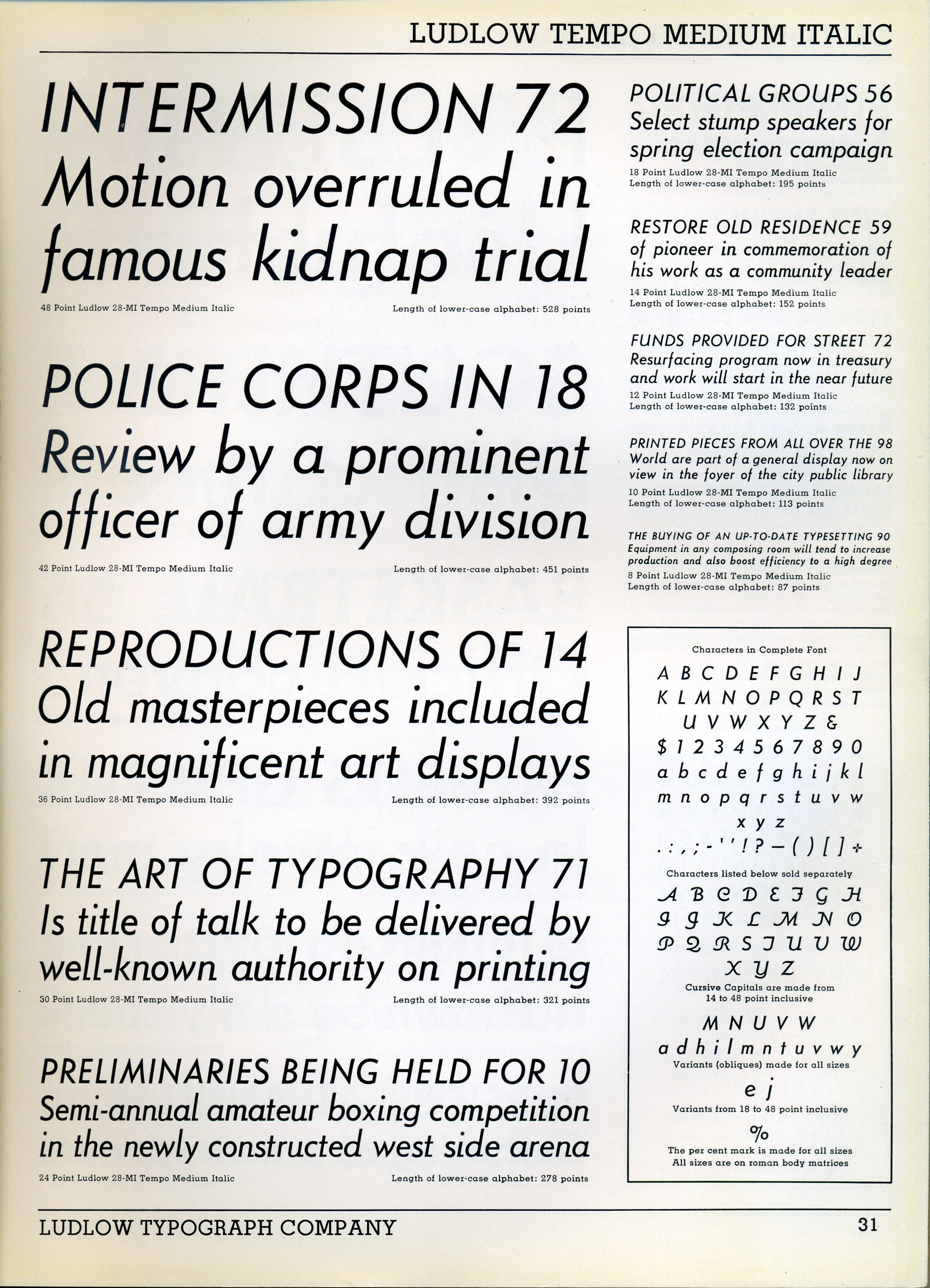
Tempo Medium Italic in a specimen sheet.

Tempo is a 1930 sans-serif typeface designed by R. Hunter Middleton for the Ludlow Typograph company.

Tempo is a geometric sans-serif design, influenced by German typefaces in this style, above all Futura, which had attracted considerable attention in the United States. Tempo was expanded to a sprawling family released over the 1930s and 40s available in sizes from small to large, that (as of 2020) has not been fully digitised. It included the shadow-form display typeface Umbra, which has often been released separately.

== Design ==
Tempo in some styles had a "dynamic" true italic, with foot serifs suggesting handwriting and optional swash capitals. Some styles had a double-storey 'a' in the usual print form, similar to Erbar, others the single-storey form in the manner of Futura, and numerous alternative characters were available, such as a choice between capitals in which the 'A' and other characters have sharp points similar to Art Deco poster lettering and designs which have them blunted off similarly to Futura Bold. Digital-period type designer James Puckett describes it as "bonkers; really four typefaces that just got lumped together for the sake of marketing." Release notes from Commercial Type comment that it as "seems to borrow as much from sign painter's Gothics as it does from Futura" and Puckett also comments that it has "big open apertures for e and s that resemble American advertising letters of the era."

Middleton also designed a slab-serif typeface in similar style, Karnak, around the same time, again copying a German trend of Futura-style "geometric" slab-serifs.

Tempo's italic, with its 'feet' at the bottom of the letters, was an influence on that of the popular 2002 geometric sans-serif family Neutraface, designed by Christian Schwartz, also creating a companion slab-serif. Schwartz's company Commercial Type also have created a sans-serif family inspired by Tempo intended for publication design, originally created for McClatchy.

== Gallery ==
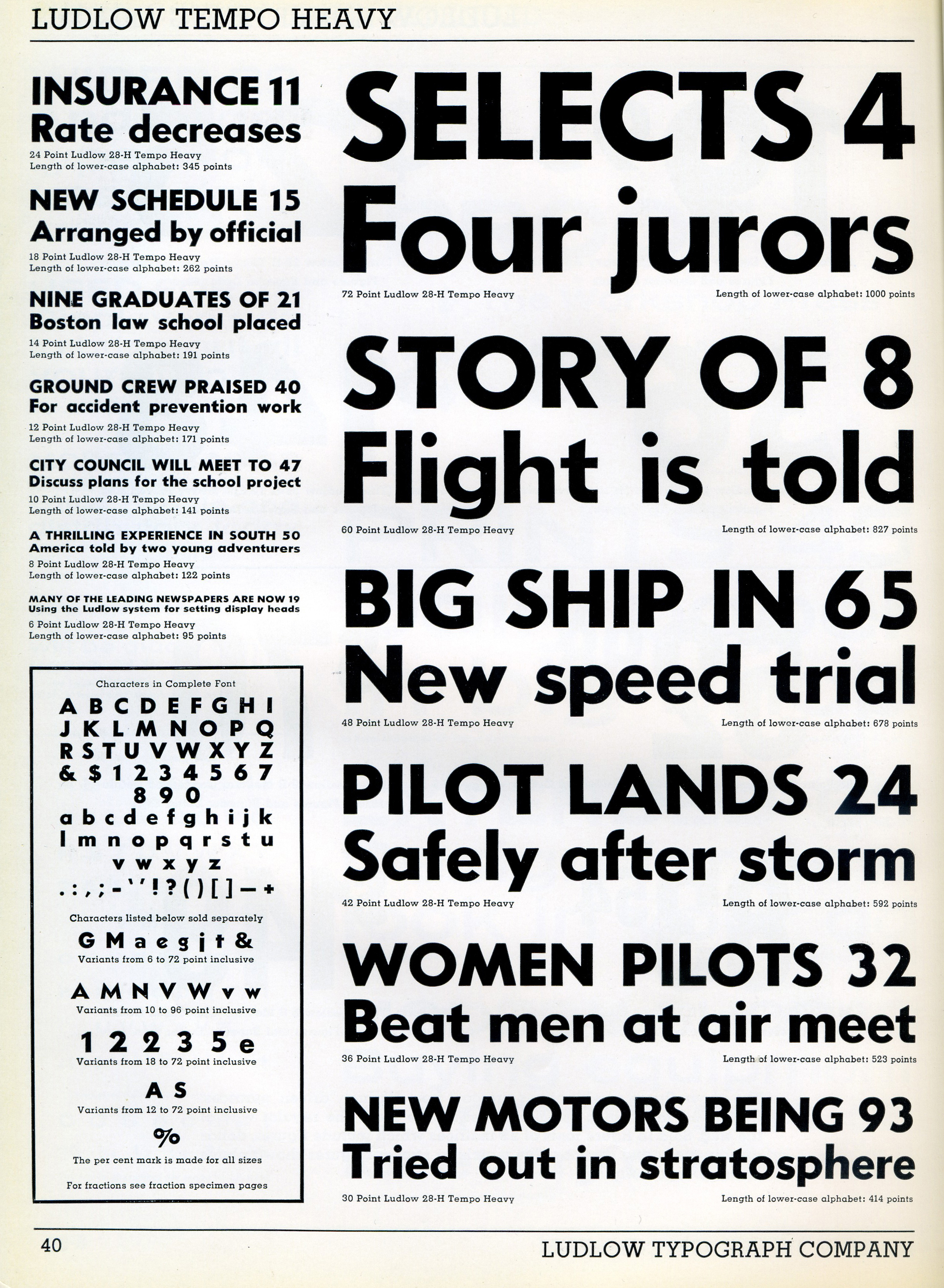
Tempo Heavy

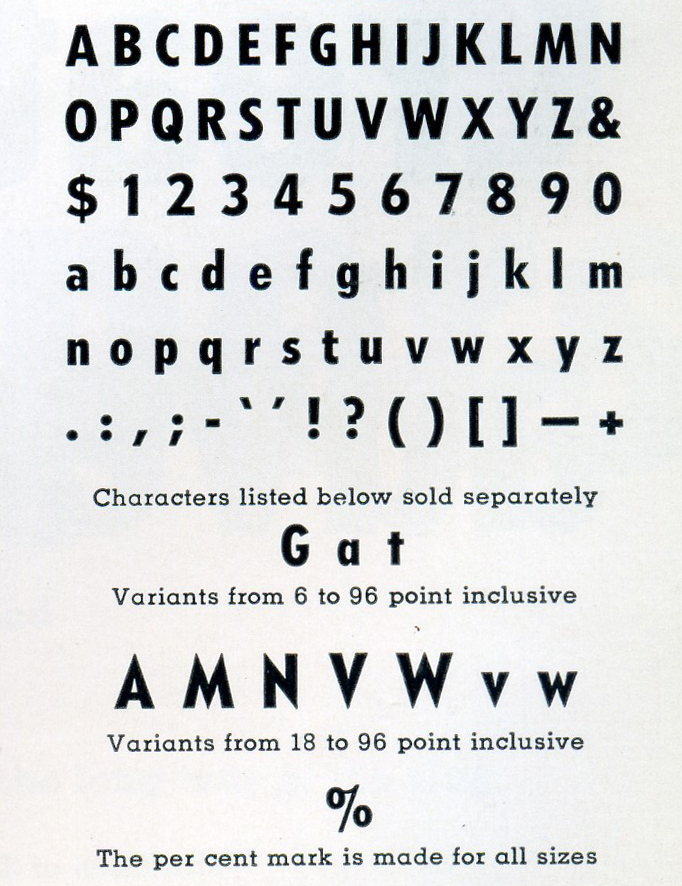
Heavy condensed, showing alternative capitals

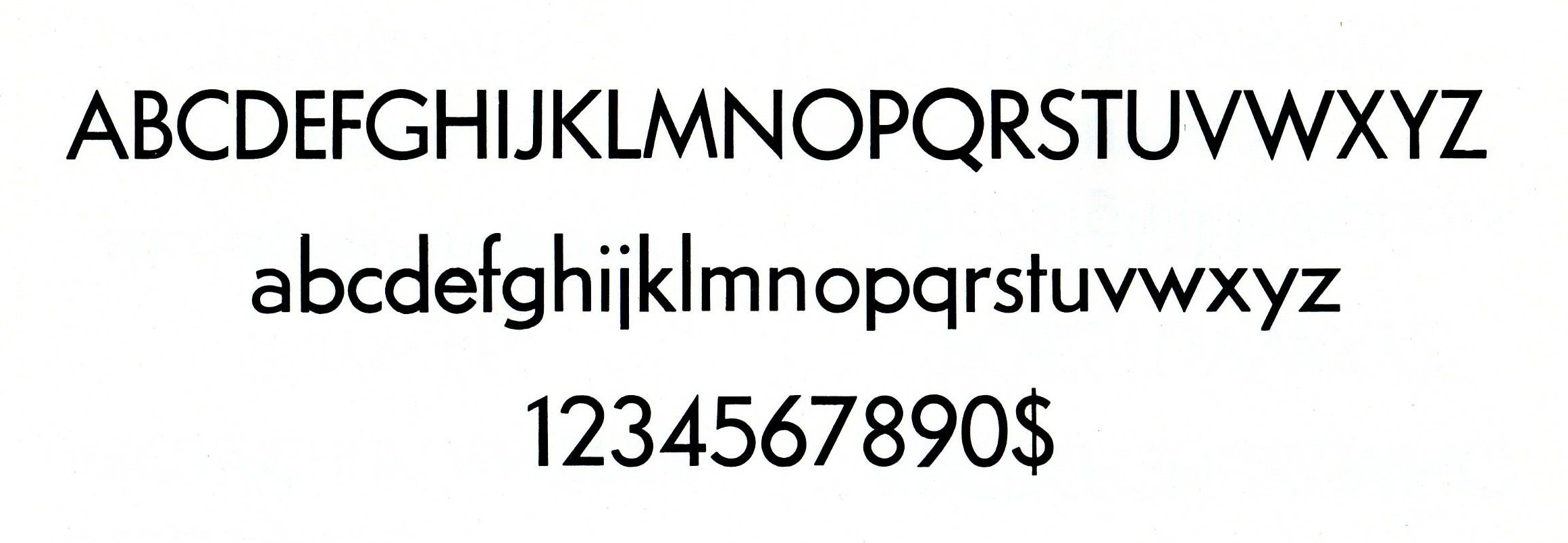
Tempo Medium

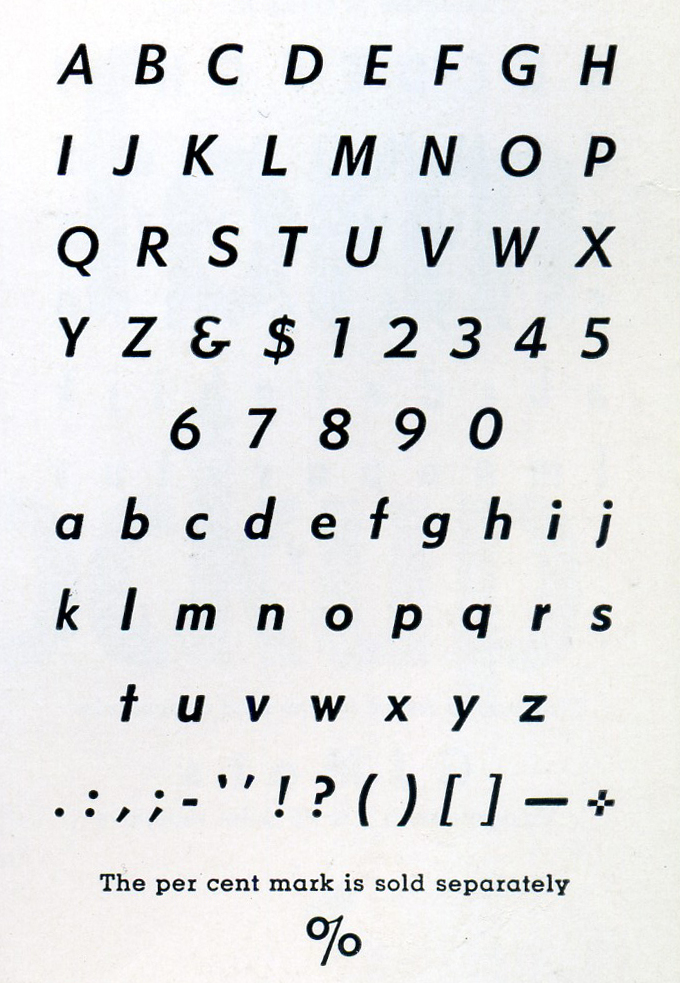
Bold Italic (this style is a strict oblique, with no tails on the characters)

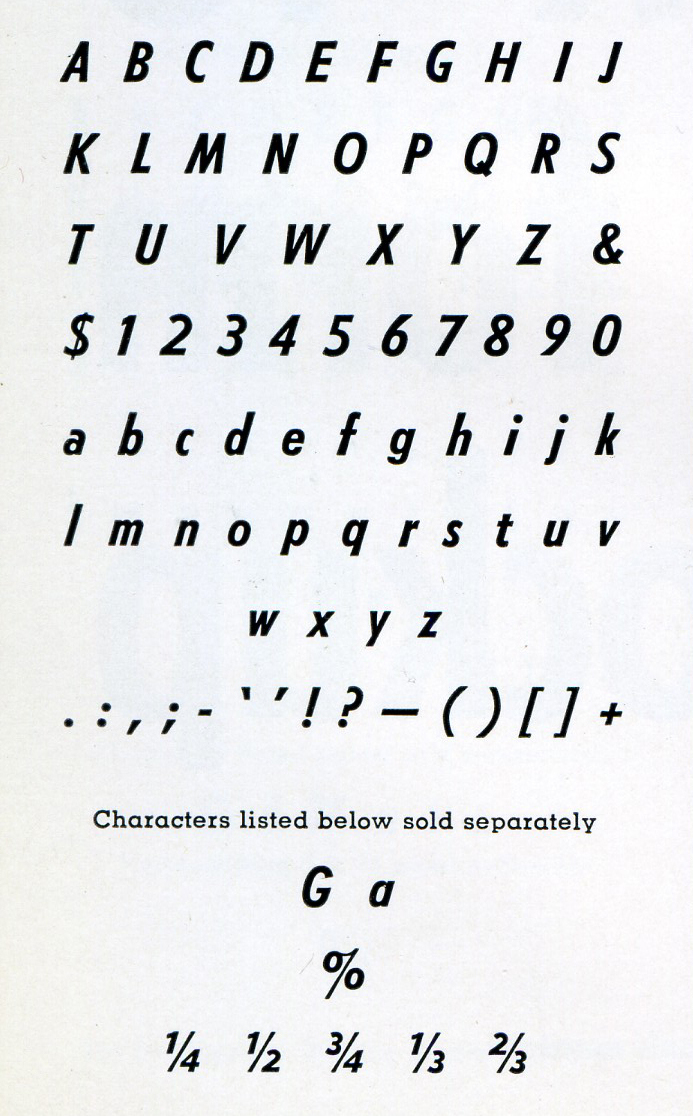
Bold Condensed Italic

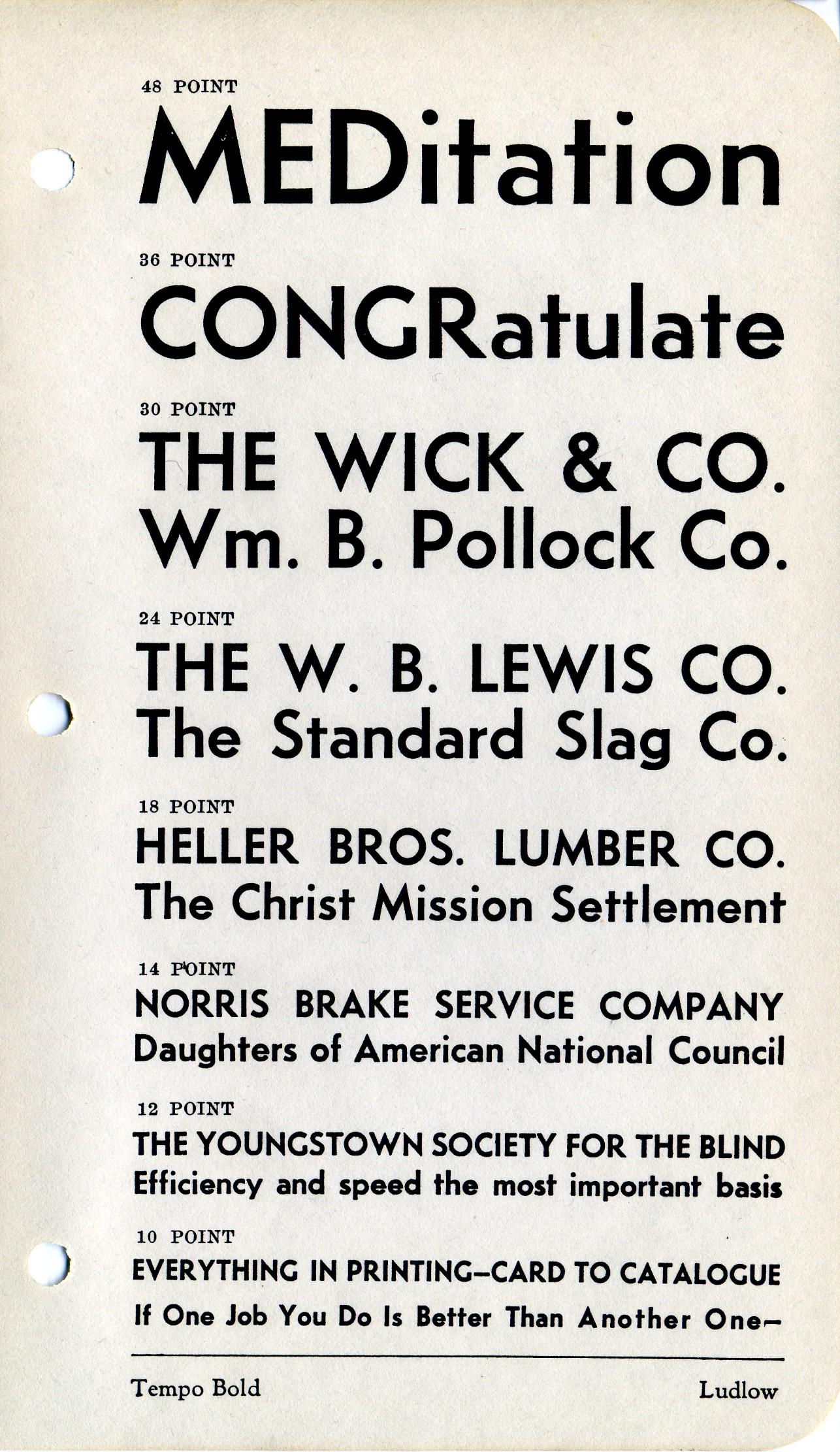
Bold specimen

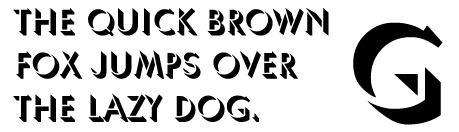
Sample of Umbra (digital font)
