= Guardian Egyptian =

Slab serif typeface commissioned for The Guardian newspaper

- Category: Slab serif
- Designers: Paul Barnes and Christian Schwartz
- Commissioned by: Mark Porter, The Guardian
- Date created: 2004–2005

The Guardian masthead typeset in Guardian Egyptian, in use between 2005 and 2018

Guardian Egyptian is a slab-serif typeface commissioned by Mark Porter for the UK newspaper The Guardian and designed by Paul Barnes and Christian Schwartz between 2004 and 2005 and published by their company Commercial Type.

It was an essential element in The Guardian's move to the Berliner format and was the typeface used in the masthead until 2018. It is part of the Guardian font family, which also includes Guardian Sans, Guardian Text Egyptian, Guardian Text Sans and Guardian Agate, all of which are also used by The Guardian.
