= Graphik =

Neo-grotesque sans-serif typeface

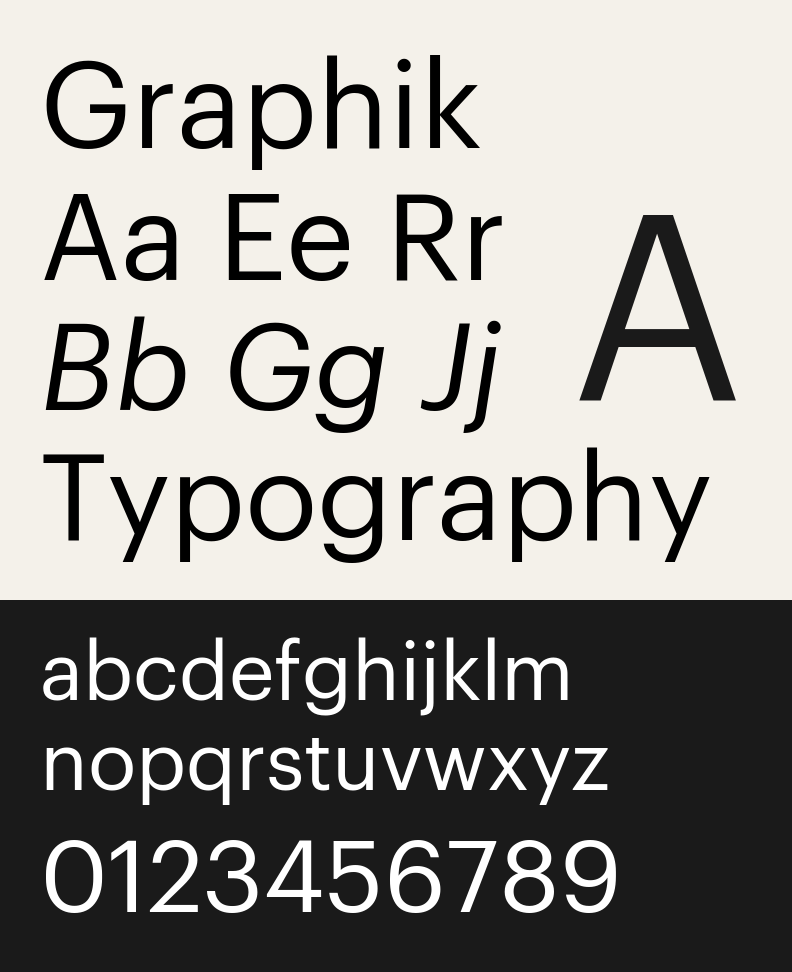
- Category: Sans-serif
- Designer: Christian Schwartz
- Commissioned by: Robert Priest and Grace Lee
- Foundry: Commercial Type
- Website: www.christianschwartz.com/graphik.shtml

Graphik is a neo-grotesque sans-serif typeface designed by Christian Schwartz and published by Commercial Type in 2009. It is currently used as Accenture's, Music Choice's and Snap Inc.'s official typeface. Eighteen styles are included with macOS.

The retail version supports Latin, Cyrillic, Greek, Arabic, Armenian, Georgian, Hebrew, and Thai. In 2014 Commercial Type introduced a slab serif companion typeface, Produkt, designed by Berton Hasebe.
