= Kievit =

Kievit may refer to:

- Northern lapwing, a bird in the lapwing family
- FF Kievit, a humanist sans-serif typeface
