= George W. Jones (printer) =

British printer and type designer

George William Jones
- Born: 18 May 1860; Upton-upon-Severn, Worcestershire
- Died: 14 May 1942 (aged 81); Droitwich Spa, Worcestershire
- Occupations: Printer and type designer
- Spouse: Eliza Sophia Ann Durham

George William Jones (1860-1942) was a British printer and type designer of the late nineteenth and twentieth century.

Jones was born in Upton-upon-Severn in Worcestershire and developed a considerable reputation as a fine printer, printing among other work elegant stationery. He operated a press at "The Sign of The Dolphin next to Dr Johnson's House in Gough Square", London and designed the custom typeface "Venezia", one of many fine printing types of the period based on the work of fifteenth-century engraver Nicolas Jenson. At his home in Monkbarns, Northwood, Middlesex, he built up a notable library, which he printed a catalogue of for the use of visitors; it was sold at auction in 1936.

In 1921, he was hired by the British branch of the Mergenthaler Linotype Company to develop new and more elegant typefaces that would enhance their reputation; at the time hot metal typesetting machines were not fully accepted by fine printers who generally used hand-set foundry type. His projects included Granjon and Estienne, two families based on the typefaces of the French renaissance, a Baskerville revival, and Georgian. Later Linotype employee Walter Tracy praised these designs, noting his partnership with Linotype draughtsman Harry Smith, who drew production drawings for the typefaces at Linotype's Altrincham factory, as a major partner in their success.

Jones married Eliza Sophia Ann Durham, who predeceased him in 1912. He retired in 1938 and died at Droitwich Spa in his home county of Worcestershire on 14 May 1942. He is buried at Holy Trinity Church, Northwood, with his wife.

== Type designs ==
- Venezia, one of the many revivals of the work of Nicolas Jenson. Jones commissioned an italic from Frederic Goudy. Originally hand-cut by punchcutter Edward Prince, later issued by Linotype.
- Granjon (c. 1924), based on the work of Claude Garamond and Robert Granjon during the French renaissance; has been digitised.

- Bernhard, a companion boldface for Granjon, named for Bernard Salomon. (Note: There seems to be some uncertainty about the later versions of Granjon Bold: the Klingpor Museum describes Granjon Bold as the work of the American Linotype designer Chauncey H. Griffith.)

- Estienne (c. 1929-30), based on the slightly earlier type designs owned by Parisian printer Robert Estienne. Very tall ascenders and descenders.
- Baskerville, a faithful revival of the type of John Baskerville.
- Georgian (1934), based on the types of Glasgow typefounder Alexander Wilson; not digitised. One of Tracy's favourites of Jones's projects, describing it as "after the Baskerville model but with more colour and character".

- Victorian, a companion boldface for Georgian.
