= Carolyn Reading Hammer =

Carolyn Hammer
- Hammer in 1940
- Born: Carolyn E. Reading; 19 July 1911; Woodford County, Kentucky
- Died: 24 July 2001 (aged 90); Lexington, Kentucky
- Education: Transylvania University; Columbia University
- Known for: Librarian, rare books, letterpress printing

Carolyn E. Hammer (née Reading; July 24, 1911 – July 19, 2001) was curator of rare books at the University of Kentucky Libraries and the founder of multiple book arts presses in Lexington, Kentucky. These include the Bur Press, the Anvil Press, and the King Library Press. She was an influential figure in modern letterpress printing in the United States.

== Early life and education ==
Born in Woodford County, Kentucky to John Windell Reading and Katherine C. Gay. Her parents divorced before 1920, and Hammer spent her formative years with her mother in Paris, Kentucky and Lexington, Kentucky. Hammer earned her undergraduate degree from Transylvania University and her graduate degree in library science from Columbia University in 1933. She worked at the Library of Congress (1933–1936), at the Stuart Robinson School in Blackey, Kentucky (1936–1940), and the University of Kentucky until her retirement in 1976. She worked with Margaret I. King, the University of Kentucky's first librarian, becoming the head of acquisitions and later the curator of rare books.

== Presses ==
=== Kentucky Monographs ===
Inspired by her class on rare books at Columbia University, Hammer and Amelia Buckley started the Bur Press in 1943. They printed a series of books called Kentucky Monographs as well as calendars with photographs by the Lexington Camera Club. The first book printed in Kentucky Monographs was written by University of Kentucky Dean of Women Margaret Newnan Wagers, entitled Education of a Gentleman: Jefferson Davis at Transylvania.

=== Bur Press ===
The members of the Bur Press included Hammer and Buckley as printers, Harriet McDonald Holladay as artist, and Mary Spears Van Meter as hand bookbinder. The first print shop was in Buckley's basement; the second and last location of the press was a room added on to Bullock Place, Hammer's home.

=== Anvil Press ===
The Anvil Press, an association of multiple printers, was founded in 1953. Members included Victor Hammer, Carolyn Reading, Waller Oliver Bullock, Virginia Clark, Clavia Goodman, Lucy and Joseph Graves, Harriett McDonald, R. Hunter Middleton, Maria Bizzoni, Gordon Bechanan, Caroline Porter, Nancy Chambers, and Martha Livesay. Publications of the press include Oration on the Dignity of Man by Pico della Mirandola, The Booke of the Duchesse by William Chaucer, and William Tyndale's The Four Gospels. After 1978, Hammer used the moniker of Anvil Press exclusively for her own printing after buying out the other press members.

=== King Library Press ===
Hammer founded the King Library Press in 1956 in the basement of the Margaret I. King Library. It was originally called the High Noon Press, because it was operated by librarians on their lunch hour. The first work produced was The Marriage of Cock Robin and Jenny Wren. Hammer served as the director of the King Library Press until her retirement in 1976.

== Personal life ==
In 1955, she married Victor Hammer (1882–1967), an Austrian-born American typographer, artist, and letterpress printer; they had no children. She studied letterpress printing under Victor starting in 1949, when he served as artist in residence at Transylvania University. The couple was friends with spiritualist Thomas Merton, exchanging a lengthy correspondence over many years.

Hammer died in Lexington, Kentucky on July 24, 2001, and is buried with Victor at Pisgah Presbyterian Church Cemetery in Woodford County, Kentucky.
