= Joshua Darden =

American typeface designer

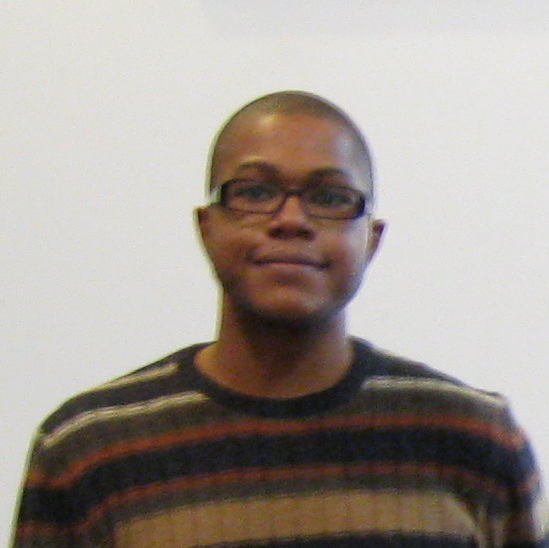
- Born: 2 January 1979 (age 47); Los Angeles, California, US
- Known for: Type design
- Awards: Print's New Visual Artists 2006

Joshua Darden (born 1979 in Northridge, Los Angeles, California) is an American typeface designer. Darden is the earliest known African-American typeface designer, having published his first typeface at the age of just 15.

== Career ==
In 1993, Darden and his high school friend Timothy Glaser co-founded The Scanjam Design Company, a studio for interactive, identity, and type design. Scanjam's retail type families included Diva, Interact, Locus, Out, Profundis, and the Macromedia-award-winning Index. These were distributed by David Carson's GarageFonts foundry.

Darden joined The Hoefler Type Foundry in 2000 as a freelancer, and in 2001 as a full-time employee. In 2004–2005, after a lengthy court battle, he established his own foundry, Darden Studio, in Brooklyn. Soon after, he published the font superfamily Freight, 120 fonts in five families (Big, Display, Micro, Sans, and Text). It was inspired by the "Dutch taste" school of typeface design, including the work of Kis, Caslon and Fleischman, and was named a "Favorite Typeface of 2005" by Typographica. It became one of his most widely seen designs, used by art directors such as Abbott Miller, Mark Porter, and Rick Valicenti, and employed by editorial platforms such as W magazine and Medium. Its popularity was perhaps matched by Omnes, as of 2020 Darden Studio's best-selling typeface; initially designed for Landor. Omnes was released in 2006 and has been used by AT&T, Carrefour, Courrier International, Crayola, Eventbrite, Fanta, and Huggies. Darden's other releases for his foundry include Birra Stout, Corundum Text, Dapifer, Halyard, and TDC award-winner, Jubilat the logo typeface of Bernie Sanders' 2016 and 2020 presidential campaigns. In 2006, Darden was named one of Print magazine's "New Visual Artists", an annual award given to 20 designers under the age of 30, and he juried the prize in 2010.

In 2019, Darden sold Darden Studio to Joyce Ketterer, who had been working at the company for 13 years. The company retained his name and continues to expand and release Darden's type designs.

== Teaching and lecturing ==
Darden has lectured at the University of California, Santa Barbara, has sat on panels at the TypeCon and South by Southwest Interactive conferences, visited the Rhode Island School of Design as a Guest Critic, and taught the design and use of typefaces at Parsons School of Design.

== Typefaces ==
Joshua Darden's typefaces include the following:

1995

- Diva

1997

- Index (with Timothy Glaser)
- Interact
- Locus (with Timothy Glaser)
- Out (with Timothy Glaser)
- Out Post (with Timothy Glaser)

1999

- Profundis (with Timothy Glaser)
- Profundis Sans (with Timothy Glaser)

2003

- Sterling (with Karen Silveira, Tobias Frere-Jones, and Jonathan Hoefler)

2004

- Bosch (with Christian Acker, Christian Schwartz, and Erik Spiekermann)

2005

- Freight (additional styles released later, not all by Darden)
- FF Meta Headline (with Christian Schwartz and Erik Spiekermann)

2006

- Corundum Text (based on the work of Simon-Pierre Fournier)
- Omnes (with Jesse Ragan)

2007

- Argent (unreleased)

2008

- Birra Stout
- Jubilat

2012

- Dapifer (with Thomas Jockin, Scott Kellum, Noam Berg, and Lucas Sharp)
- Dapifer Stencil

2017

- Halyard (with Eben Sorkin and Lucas Sharp)
