= Delphian (typeface) =

- Category: Art Deco
- Designer(s): R. Hunter Middleton
- Foundry: Ludlow Typograph
- Date created: 1928
- Re-issuing foundries: Monotype

Delphian is an all-caps display typeface created by R. Hunter Middleton in 1928 and published in metal by Ludlow. A digital version was issued by Monotype. Delphian has a modern, yet classic style and is notable for having no lower-case characters. One website commented on Middleton's font, "His tour de force, Delphian Open Title, invokes that rare intellectual response, admiration." It is rarely used today, except to evoke an art deco aura.
