= National Trust (typeface) =

Humanist sans-serif typeface

- Category: Sans-serif
- Classification: Humanist
- Designer(s): Paul Barnes

National Trust is a humanist sans-serif typeface designed by Paul Barnes for the National Trust of England, Wales and Northern Ireland. It is a corporate font family and not available for licensing.

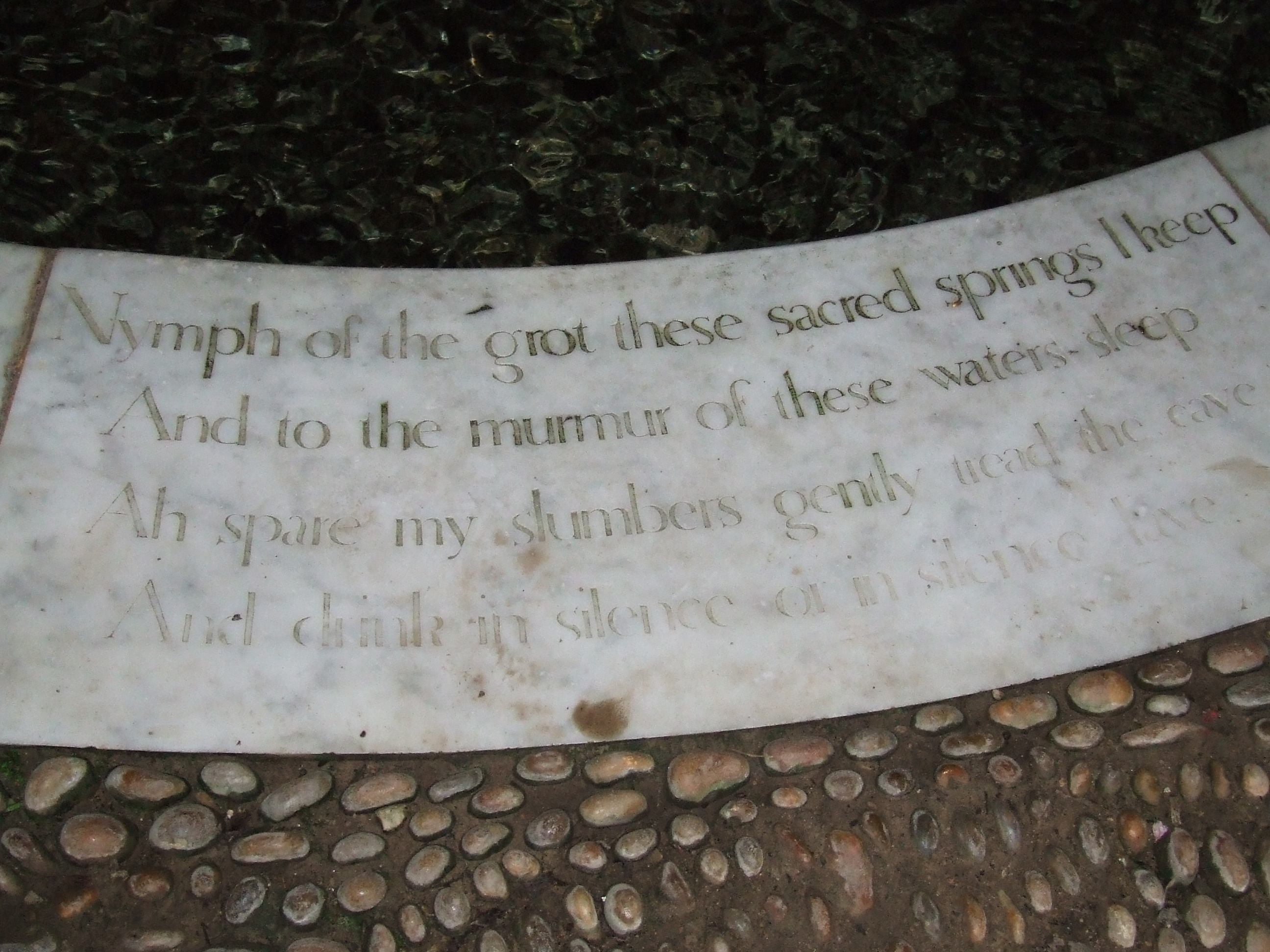
The replica Stourhead inscription with its four-line epigram.

National Trust is based on an inscription dated around 1748 on the Stourhead estate, part-owned by the National Trust since 1946. The inscription on which the font is based is an epigram, The Nymph of the Spring, in the grotto beside the lake where a statue of a nymph sleeps, and is in a mostly sans-serif style, one of the first such uses of the style since classical antiquity.

The unusual style of the inscription came to the attention of historian James Mosley, whose work The Nymph and the Grot on early sans-serif lettering is named after it. (Note: The name is a dual reference, also to "grotesque" being coincidentally a term also applied to early sans-serif fonts.) Mosley has concluded that he cannot be certain of the source of the style and that it does not seem to have influenced successors, but that its unusual, simplified structure may be an "exercise in rusticity" related to the spirit of the construction, intended to imitate a natural cave. As the inscription was destroyed by mistake in 1967, it had to be replicated from Mosley's photographs.

Being based on the Stourhead inscription makes National Trust a "stressed" or "modulated" sans-serif, with a clear difference between horizontal and vertical stroke widths. Other typefaces in this style include Optima (inspired by medieval inscriptions from Florence), Britannic and Radiant.

The four line poem, translated into English from Latin by Alexander Pope, was attributed to an inscription on a legendary Roman fountain with a statue of a sleeping nymph above the River Danube. The motif of a sleeping nymph besides a fountain was popular with Renaissance humanists and influential among neoclassical garden designers, but is now generally suspected to be a fifteenth-century forgery. In English, it runs:

Nymph of the Grot, these sacred springs I keep
And to the murmur of these waters sleep
Ah spare my slumbers, gently tread the cave
And drink in silence, or in silence lave.
