= Stencil (disambiguation) =

A stencil is a template used to draw or paint identical letters, symbols, shapes, or patterns every time it is used. The design produced by such a template is also called a stencil.

It may also refer to:

- Stencil buffer, used in 3D computer graphics
- Stencil code, a class of algorithms
- Stencil graffiti, stencils used in street art
- Stencil (numerical analysis)
- Stencil (typeface), a font
