= FF Kievit =

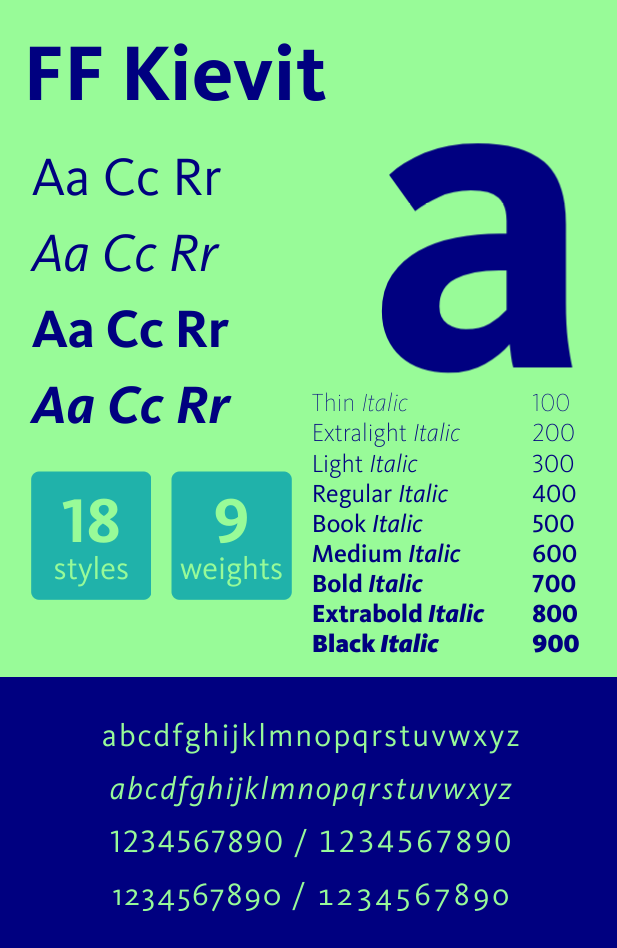
- Category: Sans-serif
- Classification: Humanist
- Designer(s): Mike Abbink; Christian Schwartz; Paul van der Laan
- Foundry: FontShop International
- Date created: 1995-2000
- Date released: 2001
- License: Commercial

FF Kievit is a humanist sans-serif typeface designed by Mike Abbink, Christian Schwartz and Paul van dan Laan, published by FontShop International, and released in 2001. It currently has 18 styles, including 9 weights and true italics, as well as small caps and text figures. It is described as being "ideal for large projects in print and on screen."

It features large x-height as well as open apertures, which are optimised for small text sizes. It takes inspiration from a number of classic sans-serif typefaces, such as Frutiger and Univers, and humanist serif typefaces including Garamond.

== History ==
Work for FF Kievit began by Mike Abbink when he was a student in design school over a few years and completed at Studio Method Inc. in San Francisco. The typeface was published by FontShop International in 2001. The original typeface family consisted of 12 styles, with six weights: Regular, Book, Medium, Bold, Extra Bold, and Black, but three lighter weights, Thin, Extra Light and Light, were later added by Paul van der Laan.

== Usage ==
FF Kievit was used as main typeface in Autodesk in the 2000s. University of California currently uses FF Kievit as main sans-serif typeface along with the serif typeface Lyon.

Westdeutscher Rundfunk (WDR, a German broadcasting service) also uses a customized version of FF Kievit, called WDR Sans. WDR designed WDR Slab and WDR Serif, based on FF Kievit, in partnership with Mike Abbink to complete the typeface family.

== Variations ==
- FF Kievit Slab is a slab serif variation of FF Kievit, released on 18 September 2013. Like the original FF Kievit, it also features 18 styles with 9 weights, and multiple OpenType features.
- FF Kievit Serif is a serif variation of FF Kievit, released on 13 August 2019. The variation has 14 styles with 7 weights, and numerous OpenType features. It is inspired by old-style serif fonts, such as Garamond and Granjon.

== Awards ==
FF Kievit received an award at ISTD TypoGraphic Awards 2001. It was featured on list of ATypI's best typefaces from previous century.
