= Umbra (typeface) =

Geometric sans-serif display typeface

- Category: Display
- Designer(s): R. Hunter Middleton
- Foundry: Ludlow
- Date created: 1935
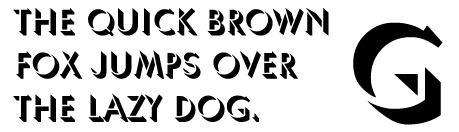
- Sample

Umbra is a sans-serif display typeface designed in 1935 by R. Hunter Middleton for the Ludlow Typograph company. It is an adaptation of the uppercase light weight of his earlier typeface Tempo. The name Umbra refers to its shadow effect, in which the actual letter shape consists of negative space and is defined solely by its black dimensional shadow. Several other typefaces were created in similar style around the same time, including shadowed weights of Gill Sans. Nebiolo's Ombra, part of their Semplicità family, is very similar.

Umbra has been digitised.
