= Ernst F. Detterer =

Ernst Frederic Detterer (1888, Lake Mills, Wisconsin – 1947, Chicago) was an American calligrapher, teacher, and typographer. He studied at Moravian College and the Pennsylvania Museum and School of Industrial Art where he took classes in lettering taught by Edward Johnston. From 1912–21 he taught wood-cut art, calligraphy and typography at Chicago Normal School. From 1921–31 he taught the history of printing at the School of the Art Institute of Chicago. The design department of the Ludlow Typograph Company commissioned him to design a Venetian type-face (i.e. one based on the designs of Venetian type-founder Nicolas Jenson), and his Nicolas Jenson was the result. Detterer's former student, R. Hunter Middleton, later expanded Nicolas Jenson into a complete type family. First cast in 1923, Nicolas Jenson was reintroduced in 1941 as Eusebius. At the time of his death, Detterer was employed as the custodian of the John M. Wing Collection on the History of Printing at the Newberry Library in Chicago.

== Typefaces ==
- Nicolas Jenson (1923, Ludlow)
- Newberry Binding Type (1935, ATF) Drawings by Detterer, metal patterns by R. Hunter Middleton, matrices cut by Robert Wiebking, cast in brass by American Type Founders
- Eusebius (1941, Ludlow) a re-issue of Nicolas Jenson.
