= Paul Barnes (designer) =

English graphic designer and typographer

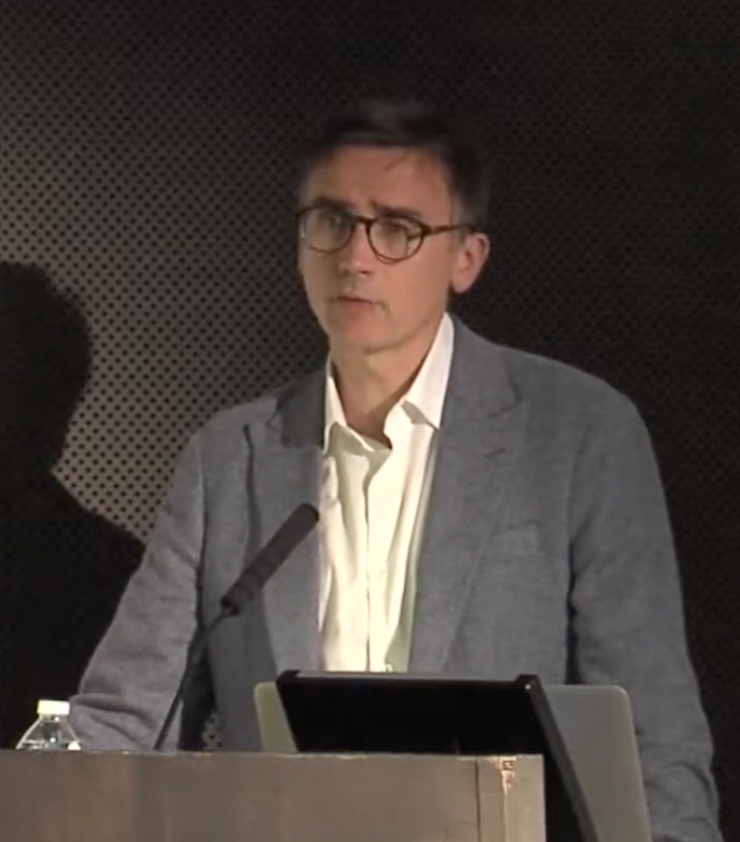
- Born: 1970 (age 55–56); Harlow, England
- Occupations: Graphic artist and typographer

Paul Barnes (born 1970, Harlow, England) is a graphic designer and typographer.

== Career ==
After an education at the University of Reading, in 1992 he emigrated to the United States to work with Roger Black. In 1995 he moved to London to work as a freelance designer. In collaboration with Peter Saville, he has developed identities for the English bands New Order, Electronic and Joy Division, as well as for ABC, Givenchy, and Kate Moss.

With Christian Schwartz he designed the very large Guardian Egyptian family typefaces for The Guardian and operates the digital type design company Commercial Type.

== Awards ==
In September 2006 he was named one of the 40 most influential designers under 40 in Wallpaper and in September 2007 The Guardian named him one of the top 50 designers in Britain.

== Typefaces designed by Paul Barnes ==
- Austin - 2003
- Brunel - 1996
- Dala Floda - 2005
- Dala Prisma - 2014
- Guardian Egyptian - 2005, with Christian Schwartz
- Ironbridge - 2002
- Marian - 2005
- National Trust - 2009, custom for the National Trust
- Pagan Poetry - 2002
- Stephenson Sans - 2001
- Stockholm - 2004

== Magazine articles by Paul Barnes ==
- Jonathan Hoefler, Baseline 23, edited by Mike Daines & Hans Dieter Reichert, Bradbourne Publishing, 1996
