= Memphis (typeface) =

Slab serif typeface

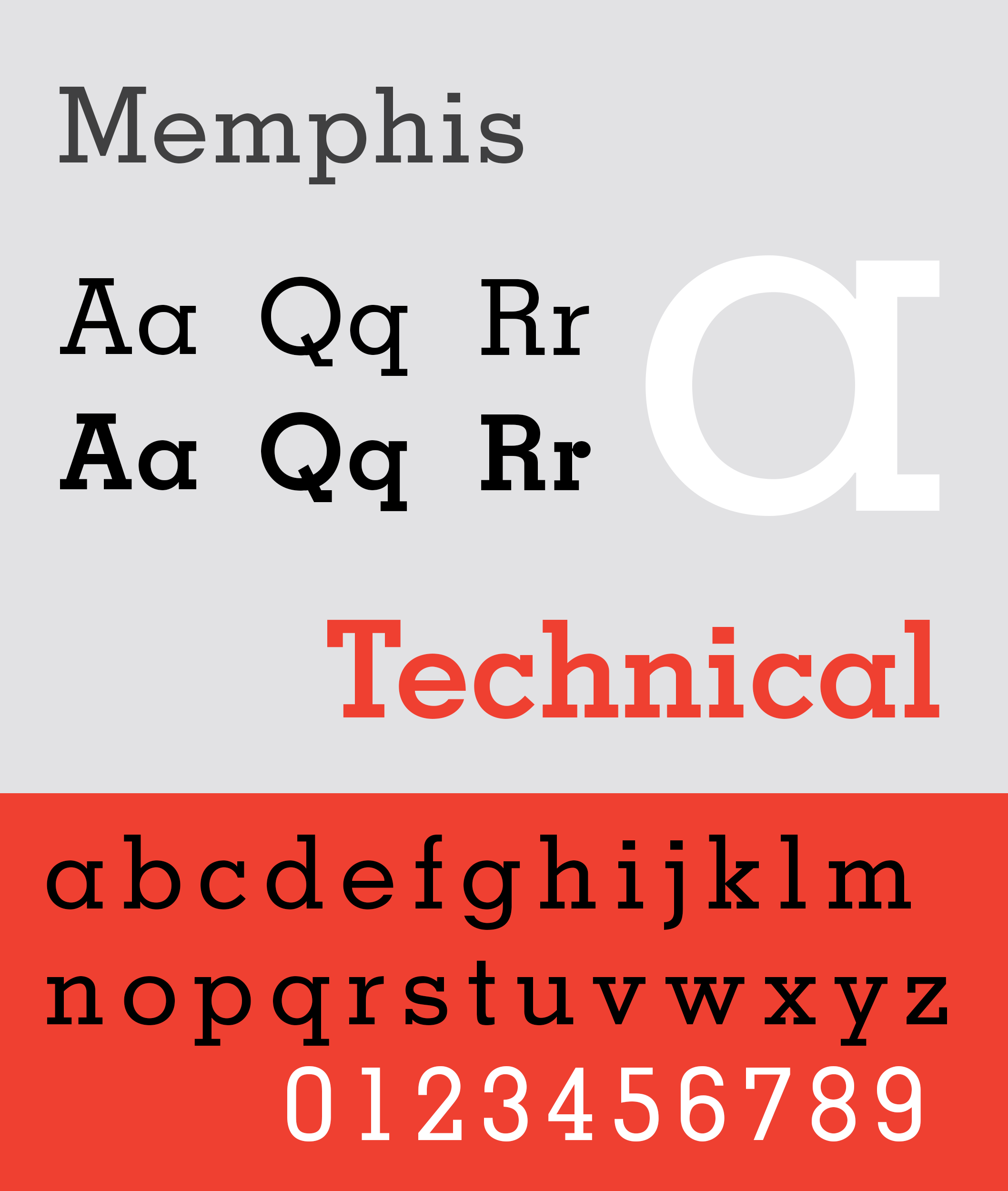
- Category: Slab serif
- Designer: Rudolf Wolf
- Foundry: Stempel Type Foundry
- Date created: 1929

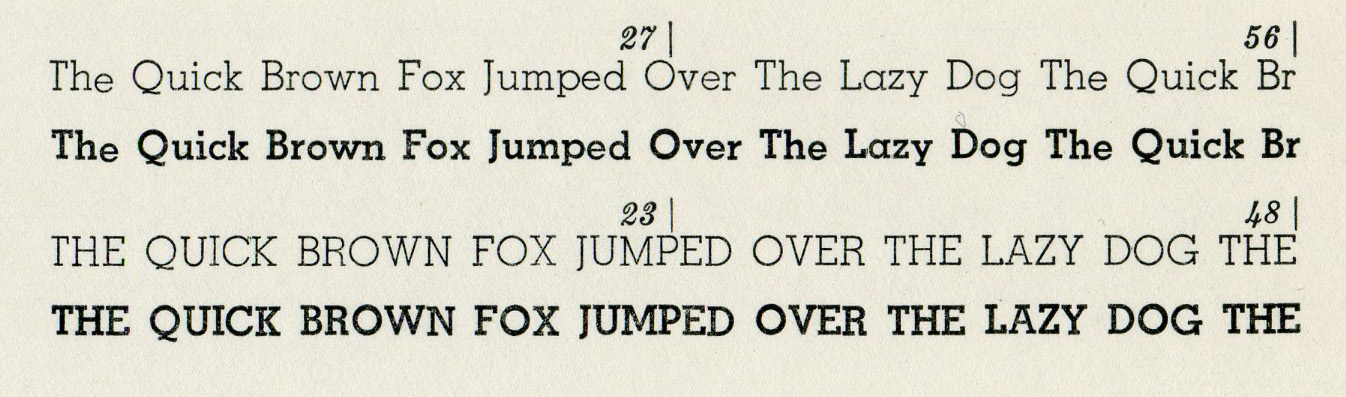
10pt Memphis in metal type.

Memphis is a slab-serif typeface designed by Rudolf Wolf and released in 1929 by the Stempel Type Foundry.

Memphis is a "geometric" slab serif, reflecting the style of German geometric sans-serifs (in particular Futura) which had attracted considerable attention, and adapting the design to the slab serif structure. Its structure is strictly monoline, with a "single-storey" 'a' similar to blackletter or handwriting, in an almost-perfect circle. It was released in several weights and with alternative characters such as swashes, which digitisations have mostly not included.

Memphis has an Egyptian name, in reference to the fact that early slab serifs were often called "Egyptians" as an exoticism by nineteenth-century typefounders. (Note: Although, confusingly, the term was first used to refer to sans-serifs, and the earliest slab-serifs were often called "Antiques".)

Memphis and other similar designs were popular in printing during the hot metal typesetting period and several foundries brought out similar designs or direct imitations such as Karnak and Stymie in the United States and Rosmini from Nebiolo in Italy, and (more loosely) Rockwell from Monotype. Digital designs in a similar style include Neutraface Slab and Archer. Memphis itself has been released digitally by Linotype, who licensed it from Stempel, and by Bitstream in a release including condensed weights under the name "Geometric Slabserif 703".
