= House Industries =

American type foundry and design studio

- Industry: Graphic design
- Genre: Typeface design
- Founded: 1993
- Founder: Andy Cruz, Rich Roat
- Headquarters: Yorklyn, Delaware, United States
- Products: Neutraface, Eames Century Modern, Chalet
- Website: houseind.com

House Industries is a type foundry and design studio based in Yorklyn, Delaware. The company was created in the 1990s in Wilmington, Delaware by co-founders Andy Cruz and Rich Roat. The company is best known for its typeface creations, which have appeared on television (e.g. Nickelodeon, Cartoon Network, Nelvana, The Walt Disney Company, TV Land, VH1's Best Week Ever), in film (e.g. Mission: Impossible III) and on commercial products (e.g. Ann Taylor garment tag, Lucky Charms logo and Green Day's Dookie album).

== History ==
Founders Andy Cruz and Rich Roat met at Miller Mauro Group, Inc., a marketing communications agency in Wilmington, Delaware. They briefly worked for Swfte International, a Miller Mauro Group client, before leaving to form Brand Design Co., Inc in 1993. Cruz and Roat formed House Industries in late 1993. Popular typefaces sold by House Industries include Neutraface, a geometric sans-serif, Eames Century Modern, inspired by the design work of Ray and Charles Eames, and Chalet, a set of designs inspired by common sans-serifs such as Avant Garde Grotesque, Helvetica and its adaptations from the 1960s to the 1990s, and a collection of revivals of the lettering of Ed Benguiat. Its SignPainter script font is bundled with macOS.

The company goes to elaborate lengths to promote its typefaces, including creating chairs, pillows and various other items inspired by the typefaces they sell. In one promotion they created the fictional character René Albert Chalet and promoted him as the creator of a new typeface Chalet. In February 2010 LAS Magazine wrote about the company's Eames Century Modern Collection, a project done in collaboration with the estate of architects Charles and Ray Eames.

An exhibition showcasing its history ran at Chapman University's Guggenheim Gallery from February 6 to March 9, 2012. It published a book, House Industries: The Process Is the Inspiration with foreword by J. J. Abrams, a fan of the company's work, in 2017. Founder Rich Roat died suddenly on 29 November 2017 aged 52.

They have also published Lettering Manual: House by Ken Barber, with a foreword by Jimmy Kimmel.

== See Also ==
- Font Diner - a retro-style typeface industry inspired by House Industries, that has also created various fonts for Cartoon Network, Disney, Nickelodeon, and more.
