= R. Hunter Middleton =

American book designer, painter and typeface designer

- Born: Robert Hunter Middleton; May 6, 1898; Glasgow, Scotland
- Died: August 3, 1985 (aged 87); Chicago
- Known for: typography
- Notable work: Tempo, Radiant

Robert Hunter Middleton (May 6, 1898 – August 3, 1985) was an American book designer, painter, and typeface designer. Born in Glasgow, Scotland he came to Chicago in 1908 where he studied at the School of the Art Institute. He joined the design department of the Ludlow Typograph Company in 1923 and served as director of the department of typeface design from 1933–71. In 1944 he began operating a private press, The Cherryburn Press. He died in Chicago.

== Typefaces ==
All of these foundry types (except Andromaque) were cast by Ludlow Typograph

- Ludlow Black (1924), a knock-off of Cooper Black
- Swash letters for Robert Wiebking's Artcraft (1924)
- Cameo (1927)
- Delphian Open Title (1928)
- Many additions to Ernst F. Detterer's Eusebius series
  - Eusebius Bold (1928)
  - Eusebius Bold Italic (1928)
  - Eusebius Open (1928)
  - Eusebius Italic (1929)
- Garamond series
  - Garamond Bold + Garamond Bold Italic (1929)
  - Garamond Italic (1929)
- Stellar + Stellar Bold (1929)
- Bodoni series
  - Bodoni Black (1930)
  - Bodoni Black Italic (1930)
  - Bodoni Modern (1936)
  - Bodoni Modern Italic (1936)
  - Bodoni Campanile (1936)
  - Bodoni Campanile Italic (1942)
- Tempo series
  - Tempo Light (1930)
  - Tempo Medium (1930)
  - Tempo Bold (1930)
  - Tempo Heavy Inline (1930)
  - Tempo Light Italic (1931)
  - Tempo Heavy (1931)
  - Tempo Heavy Condensed (1931)
  - Tempo Bold Condensed (1931)
  - Tempo Medium Condensed (1935)
  - Tempo Bold Italic (1938)
  - Tempo Heavy Condensed Italic (1941)
  - Tempo Black (1942)
- Karnak series
  - Karnak Medium (1931)
  - Karnak Black (1934)
  - Karnak Open (1935)
  - Karnak Obelisk (1935)
  - Karnak Intermediate (1937)
  - Karnak Black Italic (1937)
  - Karnak Intermediate Italic (1939)
  - Karnak Black Condensed Italic (1942)
- Mayfair Cursive (1932)
- Umbra (1932)
- LaFayette (1932)
- Mandate (1934)
- Eden Light + Eden Bold (1934)
- Coronet series, also known as Ribbon 131
  - Coronet Light (1937)
  - Coronet Bold (1938)
- Radiant series
  - Radiant Bold Extra-Condensed (1938)
  - Radiant Medium (1939)
  - Radiant Heavy (1939)
  - Radiant Bold (1940)
  - Radiant Condensed (1941)
- Stencil (1938)
- Samson (1940)
- Flair (1941)
- Condensed Gothic Outline (1953)
- Admiral Script (1953)
- Florentine Cursive (1956)
- Formal Script (1956)
- Wave (1962)
- Square Gothic (Ludlow)
- Cheltenham Cursive
- Middleton also added twenty faces to the Record Gothic type family for Ludlow between 1956 and 1961 including:
  - Record Gothic Condensed Italic
  - Record Gothic Extended + Italic
  - Record Gothic Bold + Italic
  - Record Gothic Bold Condensed
  - Record Gothic Bold Extended + Italic
  - Record Gothic Bold Extended Reverse
  - Record Gothic Thinline condensed
  - Record Gothic Heavy Condensed
  - Record Gothic Light Medium-Extended
  - Record Gothic Medium-Extended + Italic
  - Record Gothic Bold Medium-Extended
  - Record Gothic Heavy Medium-Extended
- Andromaque was a face begun by Victor Hammer and completed after his death by his friend Middleton in the early 1980s. It was privately cast by Paul H. Duensing.

While cited as America's second most prolific (metal type era) type designer after Morris Fuller Benton, many of Middleton's fonts have never been digitised. This may be because many were display or script designs which dated after their time of greatest popularity.
