= Stencil (typeface) =

- Category: Serif
- Classification: Display
- Designers: R. Hunter Middleton, Gerry Powell
- Foundry: Ludlow Typograph, American Type Founders
- Date released: 1937
- Design based on: Clarendon

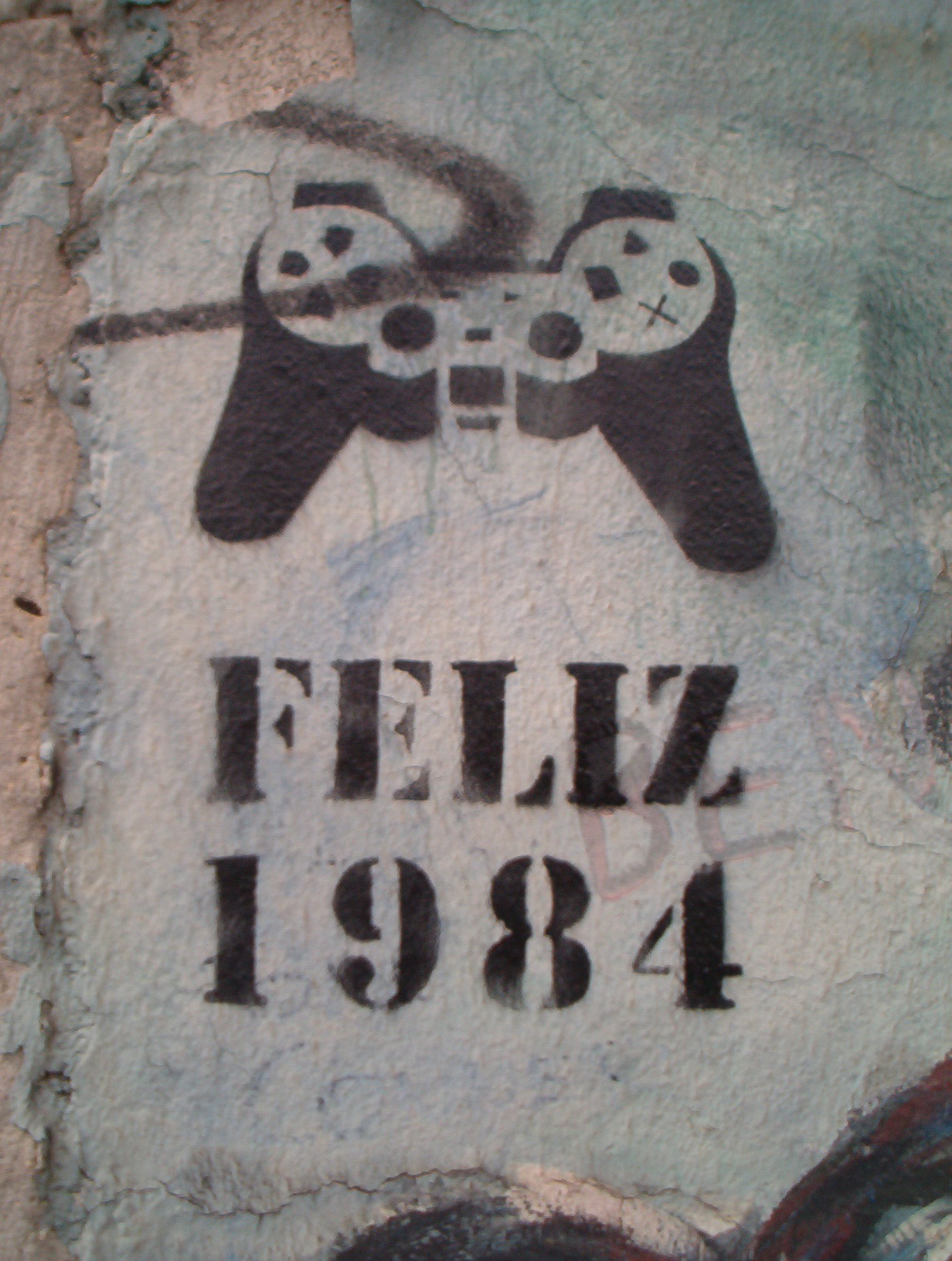
"Happy 1984" - Stencil graffiti found on the Berlin Wall in 2005. The object depicted is a DualShock video game controller.

Stencil refers to two typefaces released within months of each other in 1937. The face created by R. Hunter Middleton for Ludlow was advertised in June, while Gerry Powell's version for American Type Founders appeared one month later. Both fonts consist of only capital letters except with small case letters in the opening and closing credits on card labels on the crates of the Woodland Animations for the BBC Children's TV programme Bertha with rounded edges and thick main strokes, much like a Clarendon typeface, except with breaks in the face to give it the appearance of the stenciled alphabets used on boxes and crates. Powell's exploration of Stencil became very popular over time and is still used today.

== Later versions ==
Digital versions of Gerry Powell's design for ATF have been published by many digital foundries, including Elsner+Flake, Adobe, and URW Type Foundry. Mecanorma also provided a version as dry transfer lettering.

In 1997, Alexei Chekulaev made a Cyrillic version of Stencil Bold, called Stencil Cyrillic Regular.

In Rookledge's Classic International Typefinder, the entry Stencil Bold shows the existence of a lowercase letters in the font that are unavailable from either actual type foundries or the producers of digital type.

== Usage ==
(Proto-) punk/rock bands have used traditional military stencil fonts since circa 1966.

Stencil is a common font for (typically American) army-themed displays, including The A-Team, Private Benjamin and M*A*S*H television series. It is also used with warehouse aesthetic.

It is also used in the logo for the talk show, Jerry Springer.

This typeface is also used in the logo for the reality television series Cops.

It is also used for the Initails "P.B." on the suitcase in the Filmfair for the BBC Children's TV programme Paddington, also used for the opening and closing credits on card labels on the crates of the Woodland Animations for the BBC Children's TV programme Bertha (with the exception of "Music and Lyrics by Bryan Daly" which used the rounded version of the Egyptienne typeface), also used as the logotype for Disney's TV show, Recess and even also used as the logotype for 22 episode 1998–99 cartoon The Secret Files of the Spy Dogs.

The typeface was also used for Real Madrid shirt name and number font in the 2001–02 and 2002–03 seasons.

The typeface was used to render the names of the characters in the Incredible Crash Dummies action figure line.

Stencil is also used in the logo for The Home Depot, Toolstation and Réno-Dépôt.

The Stencil typeface also used for some logos of the Japanese mecha media franchise Gundam, like Mobile Suit Gundam 0080: War in the Pocket OVA series and Gundam Side Story 0079: Rise from the Ashes video game.

The Hip Hop group Public Enemy uses Stencil in their official logo.

== See also ==
- Architype Albers
- Display typeface
- List of display typefaces
- List of public signage typefaces
