= Coronet (typeface) =

Typeface

- Category: Script
- Designer: R. Hunter Middleton
- Foundry: Ludlow
- Date created: 1937
- Variations: Ribbon 131
- Sample

Coronet is an American typeface designed in 1937 by R. Hunter Middleton.

== Uses in popular culture ==
- Andy Warhol's "signature" on the cover of The Velvet Underground & Nico is done in this font.
- Some of the credits for I Love Lucy were in this font; it was also the typeface used for the Desilu closing ident seen on The Lucy Show and the original Star Trek series.
- It was used for the Newlyweds: Nick & Jessica logo.
- The pound signs in the logo of Who Wants to Be a Millionaire? were taken from Coronet.
- Deftones uses Ribbon 131, Bitstream's digitisation of Coronet, on some of their albums.
- Billie Eilish's Happier Than Ever uses Coronet for its cover text and associated branding.
