= Chauncey H. Griffith =

American printer and typeface designer

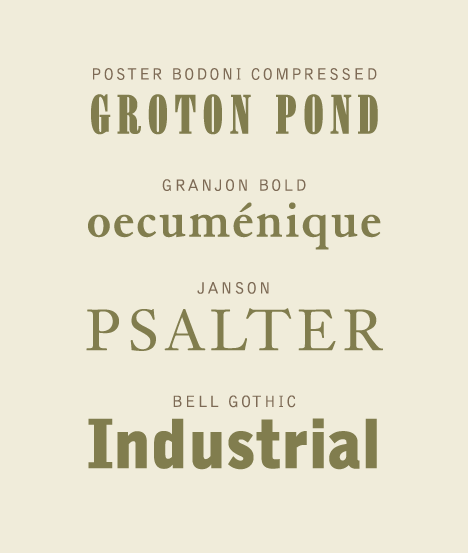
Specimens of typefaces by Chauncey H. Griffith

Chauncey H. Griffith (1879–1956) was an American printer and typeface designer.

Griffith was born in a small town near Ironton, Ohio, and began his career as a compositor and pressman in Lexington, Kentucky, where his family moved when he was ten years old. In 1906 he joined the Mergenthaler Linotype Company as part of their New Orleans sales force. In 1915, he transferred to the company's New York division, where he worked as assistant to the president and oversaw the entrenchment of Linotype equipment as the industry standard in newspaper and book composition. In 1936, he was elected the Vice President of Typographic Development.

Griffith worked closely with the designers William Addison Dwiggins and Rudolph Ruzicka, whom he solicited to create typefaces for Mergenthaler. He developed the typeface Excelsior in 1931 and it was widely adopted as a text and display face for newspapers across the United States. While Griffith was head of typographic development, Linotype issued revivals of Baskerville, Granjon, and Janson. In 1938, Griffith designed the typeface Bell Gothic for the Bell Telephone Company's directories.

Griffith's typeface designs include:

- Ionic No. 5, 1922–1925 - part of Linotype's Legibility Group of newspaper faces, also including:

- Excelsior 1931
- Paragon 1935
- Opticon 1935–1936

- Poster Bodoni, Poster Bodoni Compressed, 1929
- Granjon, 1930
- Memphis Extra Bold, Extra Bold Italic, 1936
- Bookman, 1936
- Janson, 1937
- Bell Gothic, 1938
- Ryerson Condensed, 1940
- Corona, 1941
- Monticello, 1946
