= Radiant (typeface) =

Sans-serif typeface designed by R. Hunter Middleton in 1938

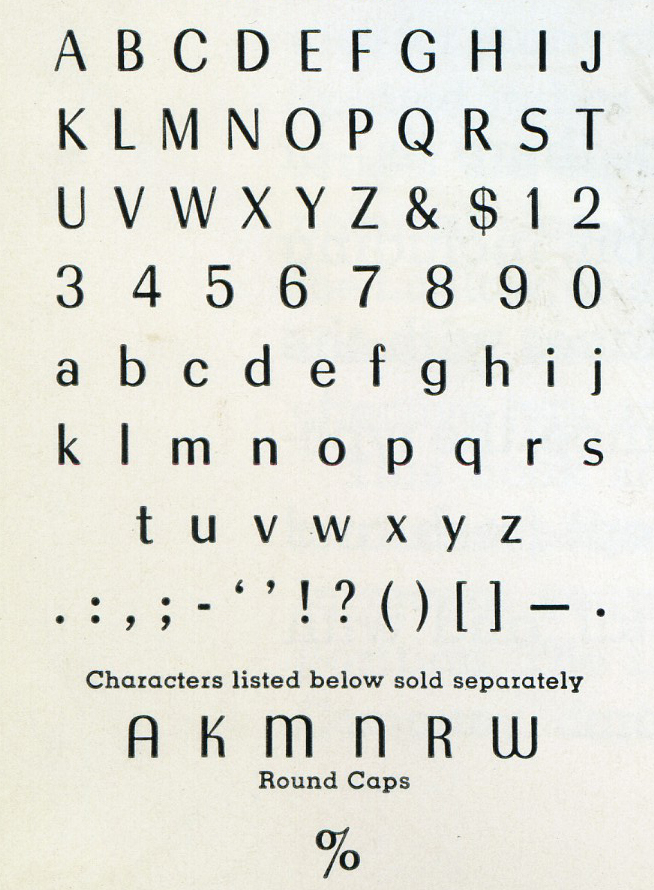
Radiant Medium in a metal type specimen sheet

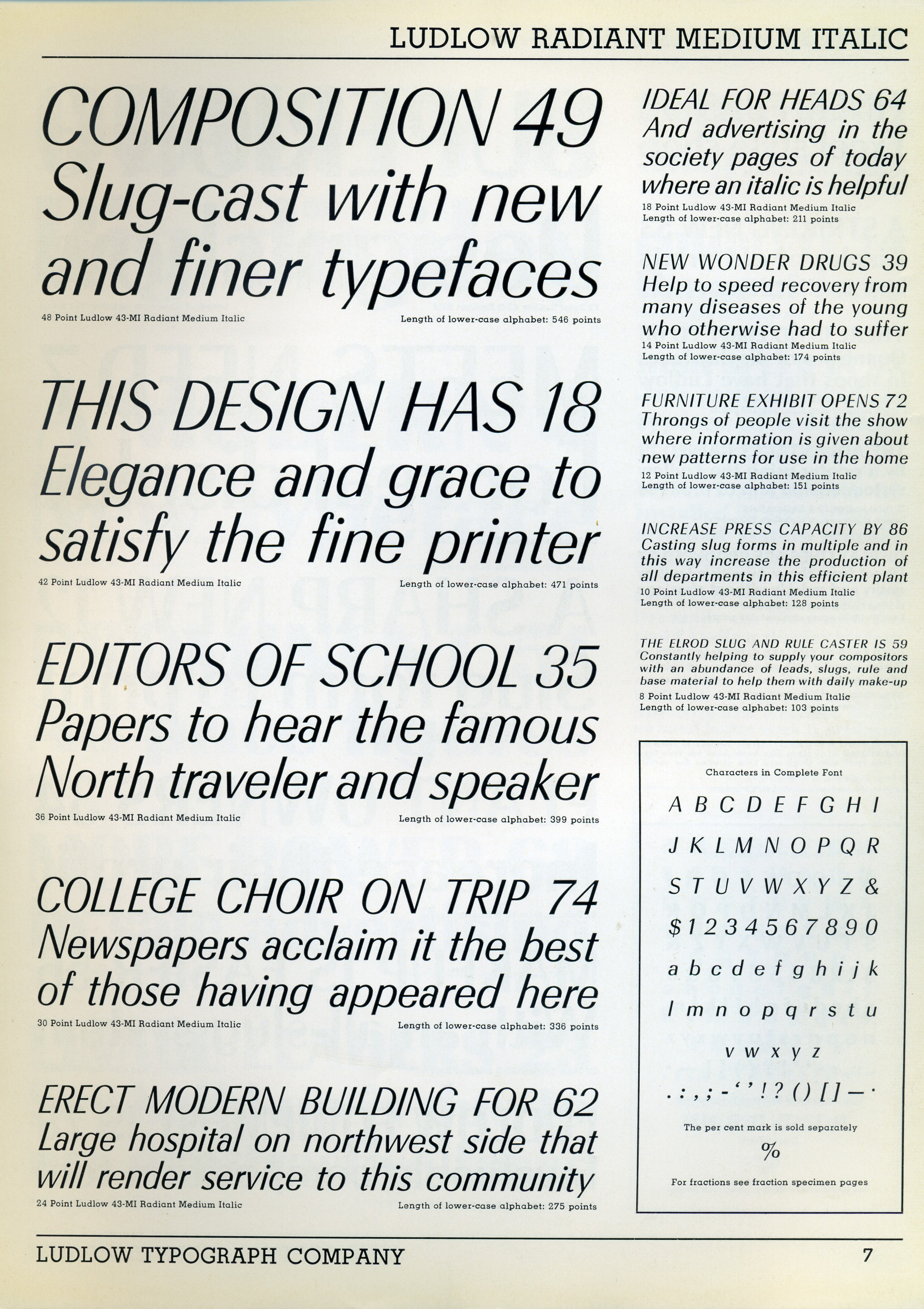
Radiant Medium in a metal type specimen

Radiant is a sans-serif typeface designed by R. Hunter Middleton in 1938 for the Ludlow Typograph company. Radiant is a "stressed" or "modulated" sans-serif, in which there is a clear difference between the weight of vertical and horizontal strokes. It is intended particularly for display and non-body-text use, such as in advertising.

Radiant has been digitised in several versions.
