= Neutraface =

Geometric sans-serif typeface

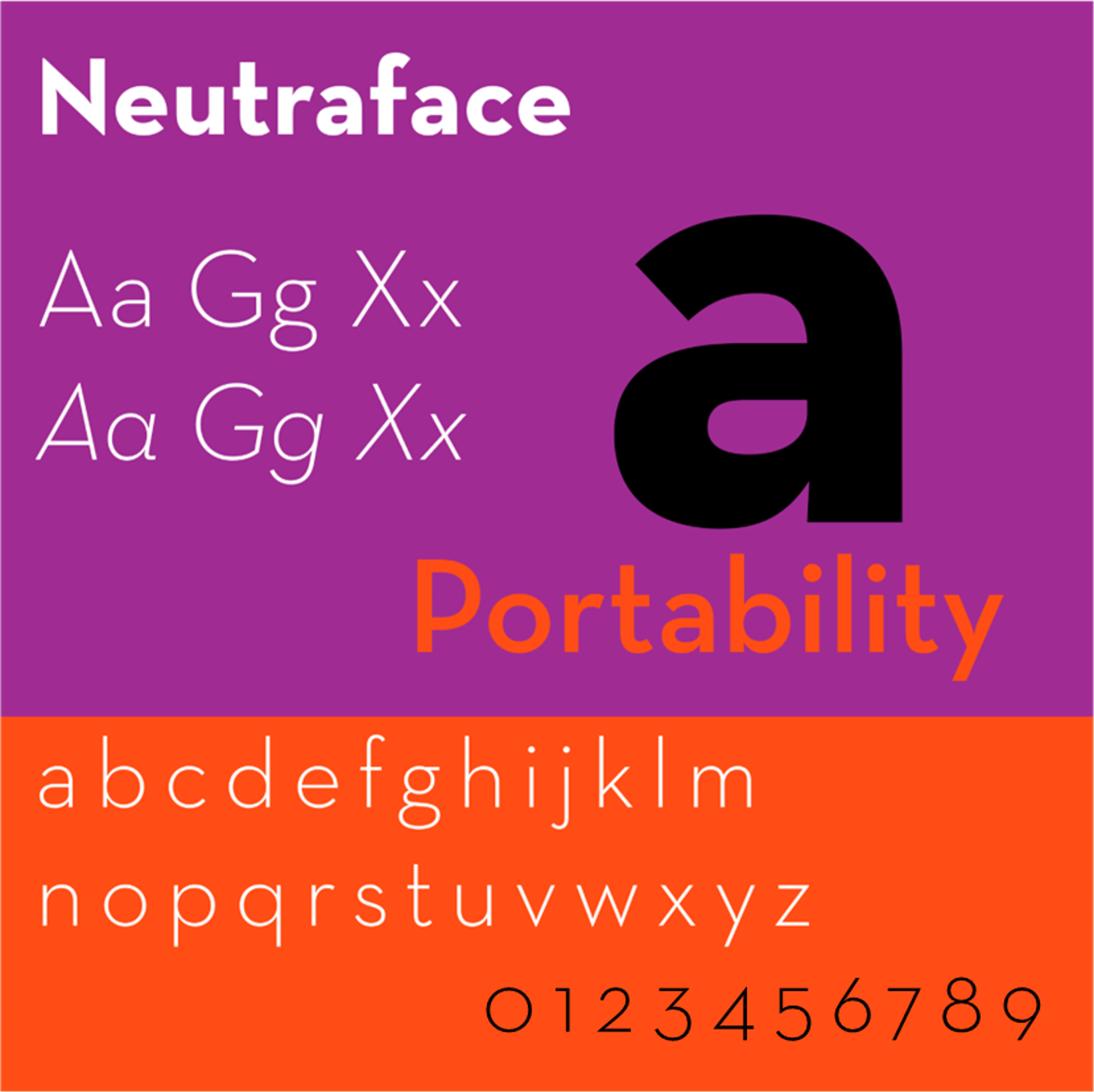
- Category: Sans-serif
- Classification: Geometric sans-serif
- Designer: Christian Schwartz
- Foundry: House Industries
- Date released: 2002

Neutraface is a geometric sans-serif typeface designed by Christian Schwartz for House Industries, an American digital type foundry. It was influenced by the work of architect Richard Neutra and was developed with the assistance of Neutra's son and former partner, Dion Neutra.

== Design ==
Neutraface was designed by Christian Schwartz over the period of a year with assistance in art direction from Ken Barber and Andy Cruz. It was the result of a project started by Schwartz to design "the most typographically complete geometric sans serif family ever", based on Richard Neutra's principles of architecture and design. The Neutraface alphabet was developed through consultation with Neutra's son and former partner, Dion Neutra, and with reference to the signs on the buildings designed by Neutra. Since there were limited samples of Neutra's signage and no lowercase, much of the design was Schwartz's invention. The lowercase was influenced by Avenir, Futura, Nobel and Tempo.

Although Neutraface was conceived as a display and headline typeface, Neutraface Text was created to complement Neutraface Display. Neutraface Text has a larger x-height than its display counterpart and increased stroke contrast.

== Styles ==
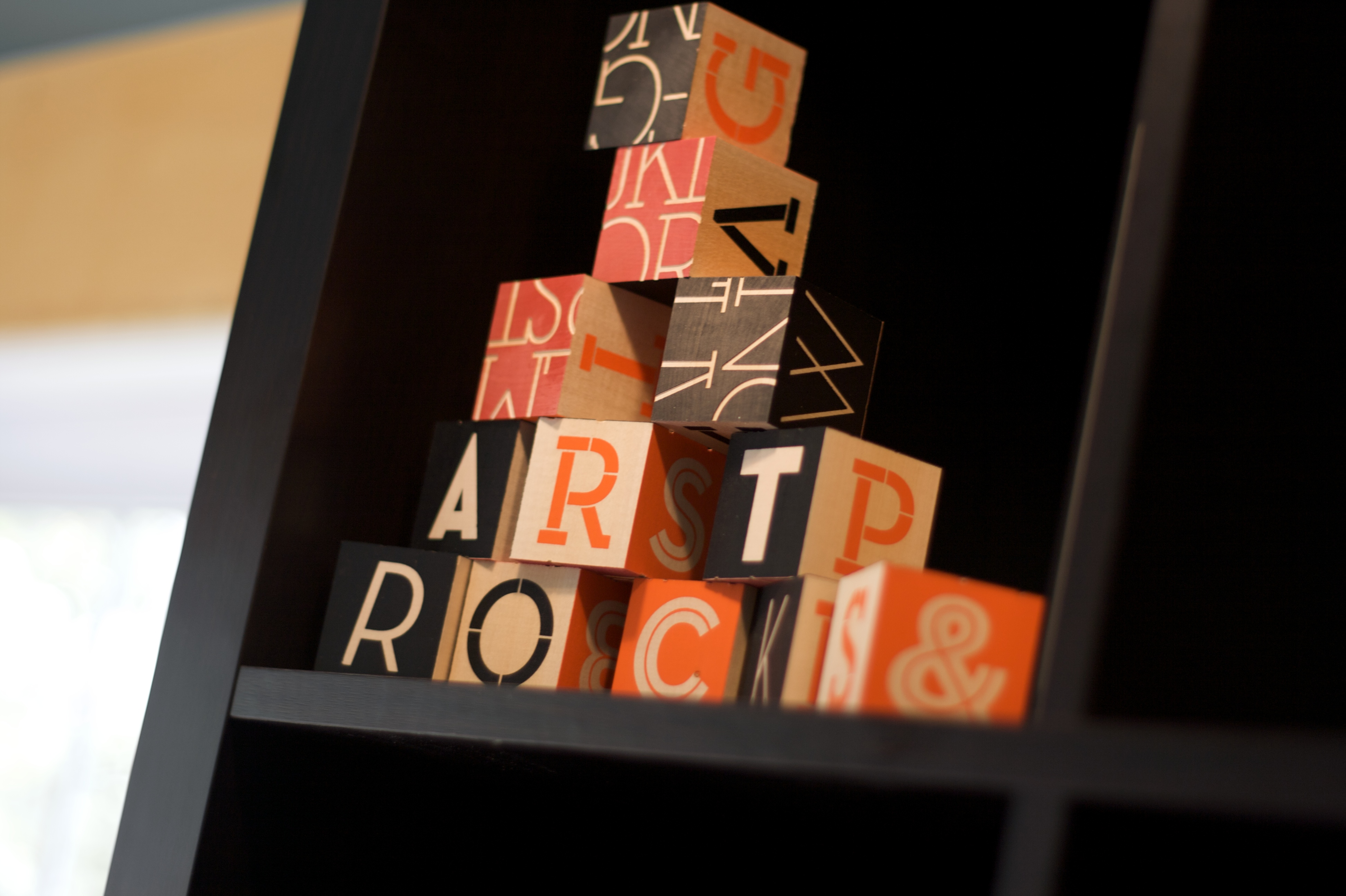
Alphabet blocks in the Neutraface typeface. The inline, slab and slab stencil styles are visible.

Neutraface was originally released with Display and Text styles. Additional weights have been released.

- Neutraface Condensed is an adaptation of Neutraface with a condensed width that Schwartz began to develop as soon as he and his colleagues realized how popular the original series was. It was released by House Industries in 2004.
- Neutraface No. 2 is a revision of Neutraface made by Schwartz in response to what he perceived to be a demand for a "more 'normal' Neutraface". It is described by Schwartz as a "director's cut" of the original typeface, with the main change being its raised crossbars, reducing the eccentricity of the design and increasing its suitability for body text. Neutraface No. 2 was released by House Industries in 2007. The family also included an inline face.
- Neutraface Slab is a derivative of Neutraface in a slab serif style, following the style of geometric slab-serif popular in the interwar period. The concept originated as a joke but when Schwartz proposed the idea to House Industries, they convinced him to follow through with the concept. The development of Neutraface Slab by Schwartz, Kai Bernau and Susana Carvalho began in 2005 and it was released by House Industries in 2009 in both text and display weights.

== Usage ==
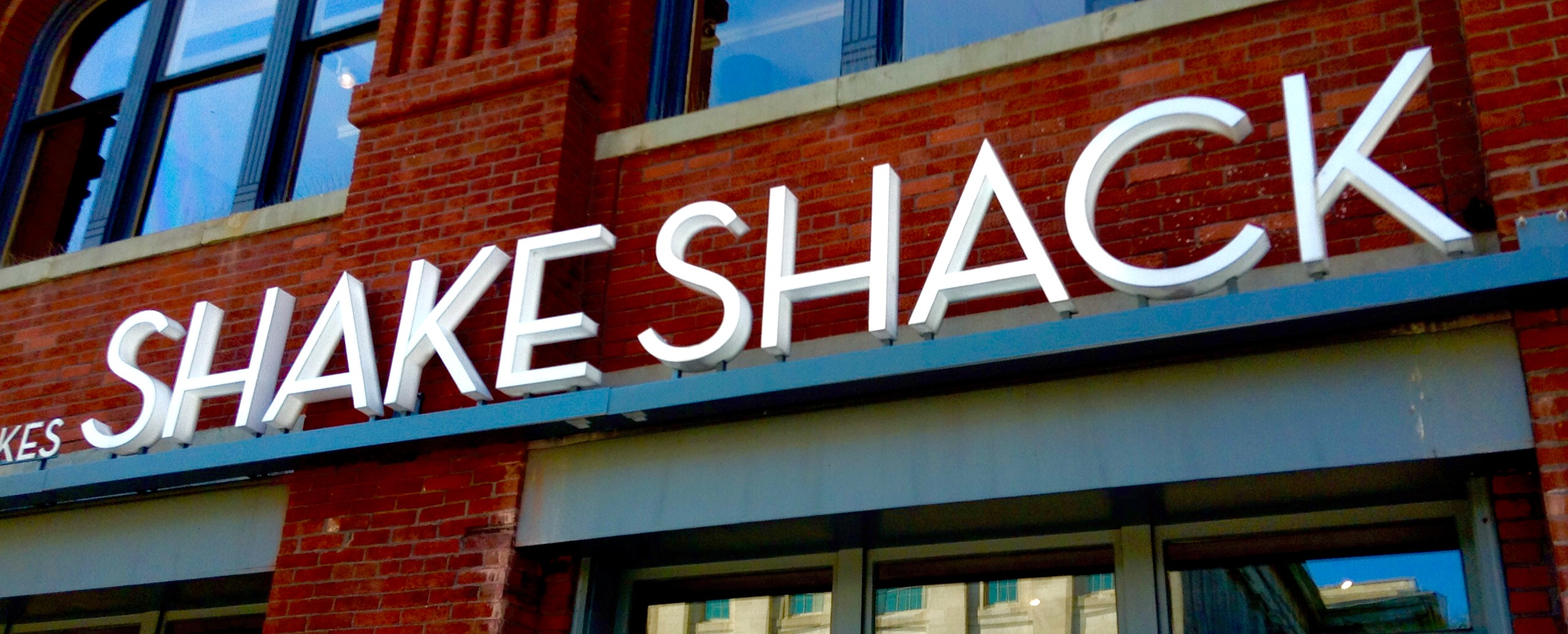
Neutraface on the logo of Shake Shack.

Neutraface is very widely used, and Schwartz has commented, "I can't leave my apartment without running into an ad for a new condo development using it, or a restaurant, or a new cookbook." Some examples of the usage of Neutraface are in the signage for the New York City Shake Shack chain, book covers for Taschen's Movie Icons series, and posters for movies. For example, it was used for the title of the 2005 remake of House of Wax, and 2008 film Quantum of Solace. Neutraface is the official font of the University of Minnesota. The font has been called the "gentrification font" for its use in house numbers on new midcenturyesque housing developments.

Neutraface was also the subject of a parody video of Lady Gaga's song "Poker Face" on YouTube, titled "Neutra Face: An Ode On A Typeface".

Asked why Neutraface became popular, Schwartz commented "I guess it was just normal enough and just different enough...a House font that you could buy and your boss would let you use. There’s only so much you could do with the Rat Fink fonts."
