= Mark Porter (designer) =

British publication designer and art director

Mark Porter (born 15 March 1960, Aberdeen, Scotland) is a British publication designer and art director, and former creative director of The Guardian. Formerly he was the art director of the Evening Standard, the UK edition of Wired, and Colors. He directed the redesign of The Guardian, which was voted best-designed newspaper in the world by the US-based Society for News Design in 2006. Porter is a graduate of Oxford University.
