= Ludlow Typograph =

Hot metal typesetting system

Ludlow Typograph Co.
- Company type: Defunct
- Industry: Graphic Arts Equipment
- Founded: 1906
- Founder: Washington I. Ludlow, William A. Reade
- Defunct: late 1980s
- Headquarters: Cleveland, Ohio; Chicago, Illinois, United States,
- Key people: Ernst F. Detterer, Robert Wiebking, R. Hunter Middleton, Douglas Crawford McMurtrie, John Schappler

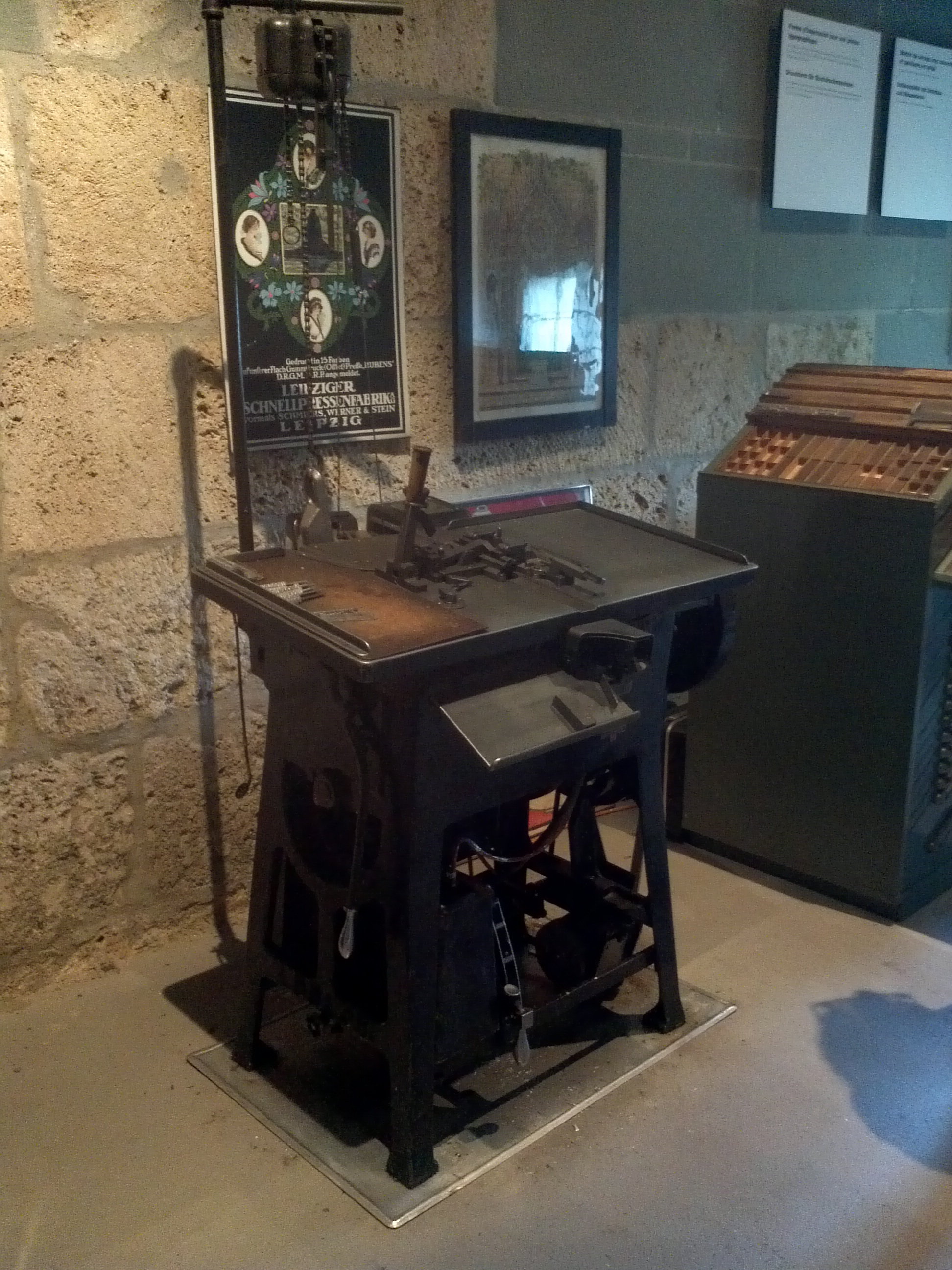
Ludlow metal typesetting machine in Gutenberg Museum in Fribourg, Switzerland

A Ludlow Typograph is a hot metal typesetting system used in letterpress printing. The device casts bars, or slugs of type, out of type metal primarily consisting of lead. These slugs are used for the actual printing, and then are melted down and recycled on the spot. It was used to print large-type material such as newspaper headlines or posters.

The Ludlow system uses molds, known as matrices or mats, which are hand-set into a special composing stick. Thus the composing process resembles that used in cold lead type printing. Once a line has been completed, the composing stick is inserted into the Ludlow machine, which clamps it firmly in place above the mold. Hot linecasting metal (the same alloy used in Linotype and Intertype machines) is then injected through the mold into the matrices, allowed to cool, and then the bottom of the slug is trimmed just before it is ejected. The operator then replaces the matrices, or mats, back into the typecase by hand. Since the mats are of a consistent height, irrespective of typeface size, they are easier to handle than lead type.

The primary functional differences between a Ludlow Typograph and a Linotype is that the latter uses a keyboard to compose each line of type while Ludlow uses hand-set mats, and that an ordinary Linotype was limited to faces smaller than 24 point but Ludlow made whole alphabets up to 96 point and figures as large as 240 point. The machine is much simpler and takes up less floor space, and the initial investment in the machine and mats is more affordable for a small print shop than a Linotype, primarily used by larger printers and formerly in newspapers. Neither the Ludlow Typograph nor the Linotype is currently made; however, both machines can still be serviced, and parts and mats are readily available.

The worth of the Ludlow lies in the fact that the printer always has fresh, clean type to print from, and never has to worry about running out of sorts. The Ludlow is used primarily for headline-sized type 14 point and above, although mats were formerly made in many typefaces as small as 4 points. The mats themselves were made out of a brass alloy. One thing an operator has to make sure of is that the line is solidly locked down with no gaps between the mats, and the composing stick in its proper place. Because of the pressure at which the type metal is forced into the mold cavity, any gaps in the line will lead to a 'squirt' of hot metal, and any print shop that had a Ludlow will often have spots of type metal on the ceiling or on the wall behind the machine.

The machine has a heated crucible for the hot type metal, with a mechanically actuated plunger which operates as part of the injection cycle. The pot on the machine was usually left on overnight during the week, with some flux added to the pot to reduce oxidation. At the end of each week, the plunger assembly had to be disassembled (while hot), removed, and the pump well cleaned using a scraper (as with linecasting machines). After reassembly, heat was removed for the weekend. In the present day, most machines are heated up only for that day's casting, with the heat turned off each night.

== Ludlow Typograph Co. ==
The Ludlow Typograph Company was the manufacturer of the device. It was founded in 1906 by the machine's inventor, Washington Irving Ludlow, and machinist William A. Reade to manufacture a simpler, cheaper version of the Linotype. This, however, proved impractical, and so an even simpler typecasting system, the typograph described above, was devised. Manufacturing began in Chicago in 1912 and by 1919 Typographs were in service in over 350 printing offices. In 1920 the company bought out the Elrod Slug Casting Co., of Omaha.

Competition in large format line-casters came from Mergenthaler Linotype with its APL (All-Purpose Linotype), Lanston Monotype which sold the Italian Nebitype hand-set caster, and Intertype, which offered a "Composing Stick Attachment" that allowed their caster to be used to cast headlines up to 60 points. None of these competing systems achieved much success, however, and the typical job shop of the letterpress era usually had both a line-caster for text, and a Ludlow for casting headlines.

Ludlow faces were proprietary and the principal typographer at Ludlow was R. Hunter Middleton, creator of several notable font designs, including Coronet, Stencil, Delphian Open Title, Eusebius, Flair, Radiant, Record Gothic, Stellar, Tempo, Umbra and many others. Other noted designers for Ludlow included Robert Wiebking, Douglas Crawford McMurtrie who served as director of advertising and typography before Middleton, and Hermann Zapf, whose Optima and Palatino were among the last faces cut for Ludlow.

Despite the rapid decline of letterpress printing in the 1960s, Ludlow continued in operation at least through the mid-1980s, because Ludlow matrices can also be used by rubber stamp manufacturers. In the early 1980s, the company claimed that 16,000 Ludlows were in operation throughout the world.
