= Commercial Type =

Digital type foundry based in New York

- Industry: Graphic design
- Genre: Typeface design
- Founded: 2007
- Founder: Paul Barnes, Christian Schwartz
- Headquarters: New York City, United States
- Products: Guardian Egyptian, Graphik, Druk
- Website: commercialtype.com

Commercial Type is a digital type foundry established in 2007 by type designers Paul Barnes and Christian Schwartz. Its work includes typefaces for The Guardian, such as the Guardian Egyptian series, and other retail and commissioned typefaces. It created the open-source Roboto Serif typeface for Google and several of its typefaces are bundled with macOS.
