= Red Circle (typeface) =

Geometric sans-serif typeface

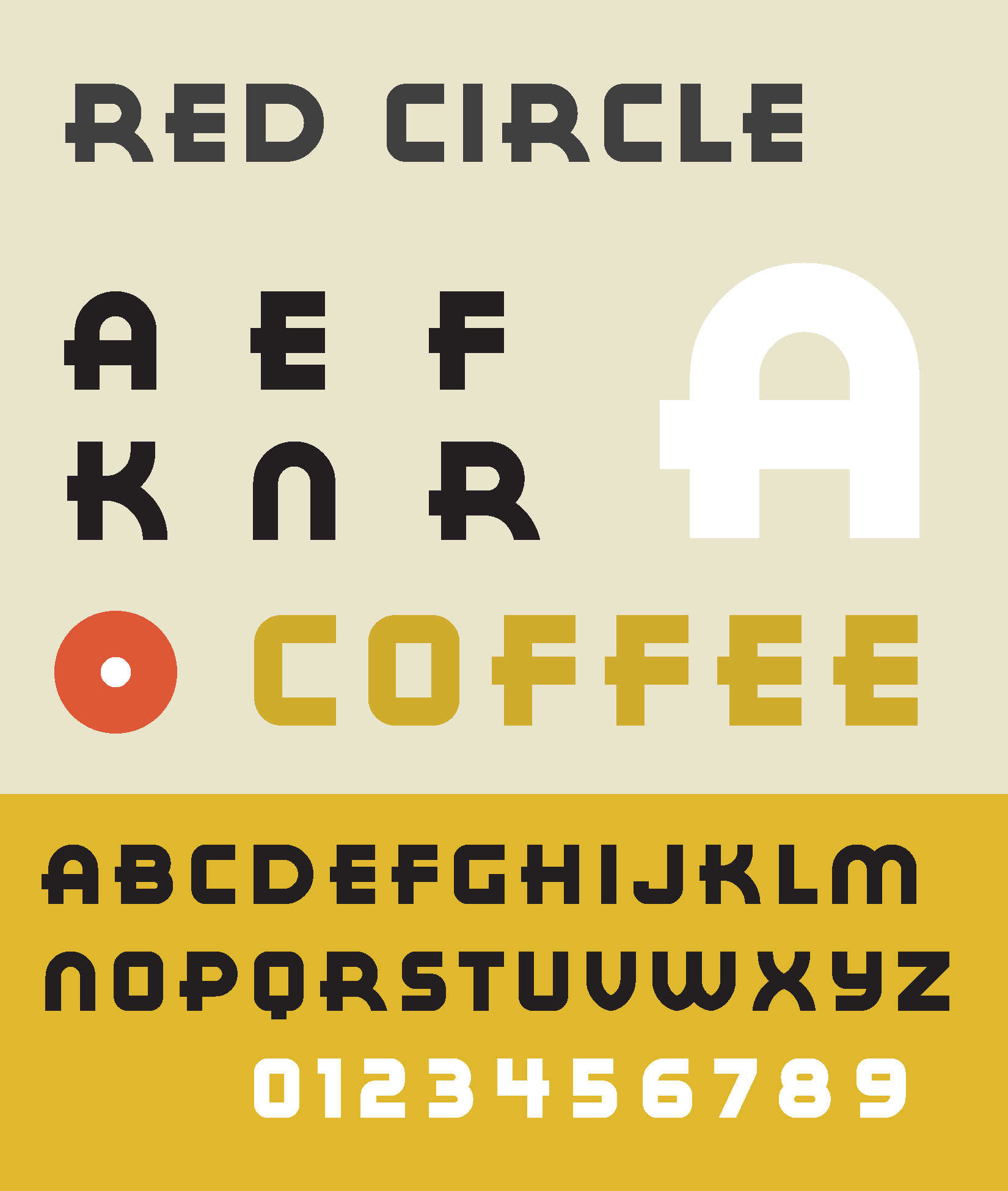
- Category: Sans-serif
- Classification: Geometric Sans-serif
- Designer: Harold Lohner
- Foundry: Harold Fonts
- Date released: 2006

Red Circle is a geometric sans-serif typeface designed by Harold Lohner and based upon the c. 1930 lettering used in packaging and advertising for the range of A&P's Eight O'Clock, Red Circle, and Bokar brands of whole bean arabica coffees.

Red Circle is an all uppercase typeface exhibiting the geometric exploration of the Art Deco period. While having an overall rectilinear structure, circular forms are prominent in the characters A, B, D, M, N, and R. The lettering bears comparison with Georg Trump's City typeface. Exterior corners are rounded, and cross strokes extend left of the stem in characters A, B, E, H, K, P, and R. The characters M and N take the form of Carolingian minuscule characters m and n similar to the same characters in Herbert Bayer's 1927 experimental universal typeface Architype Bayer.

Lohner offers the face as a font for the Mac and Windows operating systems.
