= Gill Sans =

Humanist sans-serif typeface

- Category: Sans-serif
- Classification: Humanist
- Designer: Eric Gill
- Foundry: Monotype
- Date created: 1926
- Date released: 1928; 98 years ago
- Design based on: Johnston
- Variations: Gill Kayo; Gill Sans Nova; Gill Sans MT

Gill Sans is a humanist sans-serif typeface designed by Eric Gill and released by the British branch of Monotype in 1928. It is based on Edward Johnston's 1916 "Underground Alphabet", the corporate typeface of London Underground.

As a young artist, Gill had assisted Johnston in its early development stages. In 1926, Douglas Cleverdon, a young printer-publisher, opened a bookshop in Bristol, and Gill painted a fascia for the shop for him using sans-serif capitals. In addition, Gill sketched an alphabet for Cleverdon as a guide for him to use for future notices and announcements. By this time, Gill had become a prominent stonemason, artist and creator of lettering in his own right, and had begun to work on creating typeface designs.

Gill was commissioned to develop his alphabet into a full type family by his friend Stanley Morison, an influential Monotype executive and historian of printing. Morison hoped that it could be Monotype's competitor to a wave of German sans-serif families in a new "geometric" style, which included Erbar, Futura and Kabel, all of which had been launched to considerable attention in Germany during the late 1920s. Gill Sans was initially released as a set of titling capitals that was quickly followed by a lower-case. Gill's aim was to blend the influences of Johnston, classic serif typefaces and Roman inscriptions to create a design that looked both cleanly modern and classical at the same time. Because Gill Sans was designed before the practice of setting documents entirely in sans-serif text became common, its standard weight is noticeably bolder than most modern body text fonts.

Gill Sans was an immediate success; a year after its release, the London and North Eastern Railway (LNER) chose the typeface for all its posters, timetables and publicity material. British Railways chose Gill Sans as the basis for its standard lettering when the Big Four railway companies were nationalised in 1948. Gill Sans also soon became used on the deliberately simple modernist covers of Penguin Books, and was sold up to very large font sizes, which were often used in British posters and notices of the period. Gill Sans was one of the dominant typefaces in British printing in the years after its release, and remains extremely popular. It has been described as "the British Helvetica" because of its lasting popularity in British design. Gill Sans has influenced many other typefaces and helped to define a genre of sans-serif, known as the humanist style.

Monotype rapidly expanded the original regular or medium weight into a large family of styles, which it continues to sell. A basic set is included with some Microsoft software and macOS fonts.

== Characteristics ==
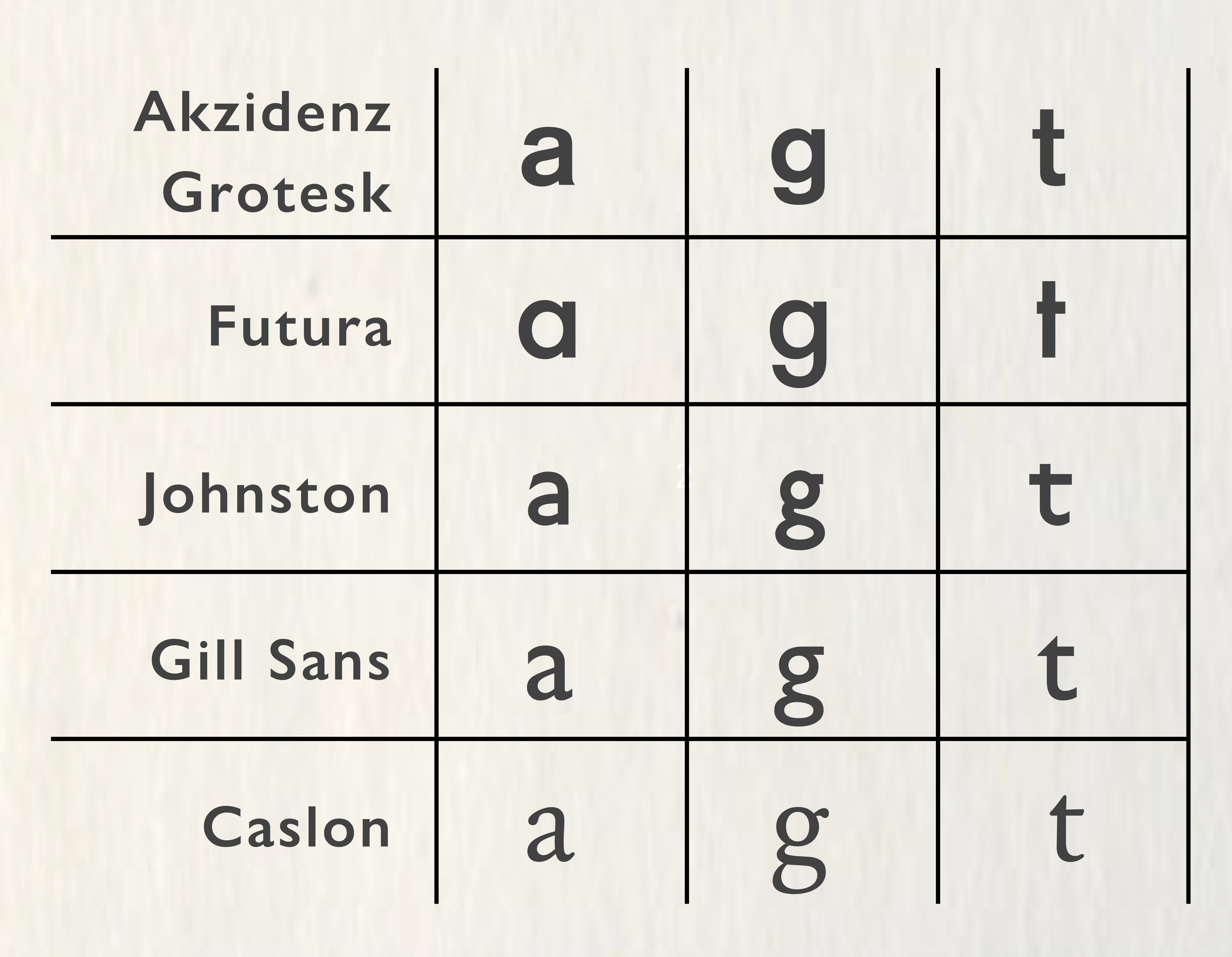
Gill Sans compared to other sans-serifs of the period. Gill Sans does not use the single-storey "g" or "a" used by many sans-serifs and is less monoline than Johnston. Its structure is influenced by traditional serif fonts such as Caslon rather than being strongly based on straight lines and circles as Futura is.

The proportions of Gill Sans stem from monumental Roman capitals in the uppercase, and traditional "old-style" serif letters in the lower-case. This gives it a very different style compared to geometric sans-serifs based on simple squares and circles, like Futura, or grotesque or "industrial" designs influenced by nineteenth-century lettering styles, like Akzidenz-Grotesk, Helvetica and Univers. For example, the "C" and "a" have a much less "folded up" structure compared to grotesque sans-serifs, with wider apertures. The "a" and "g" in the roman or regular style are "double-storey" designs, rather than the "single-storey" forms used in handwriting and blackletter often found in grotesque and especially geometric sans-serifs.

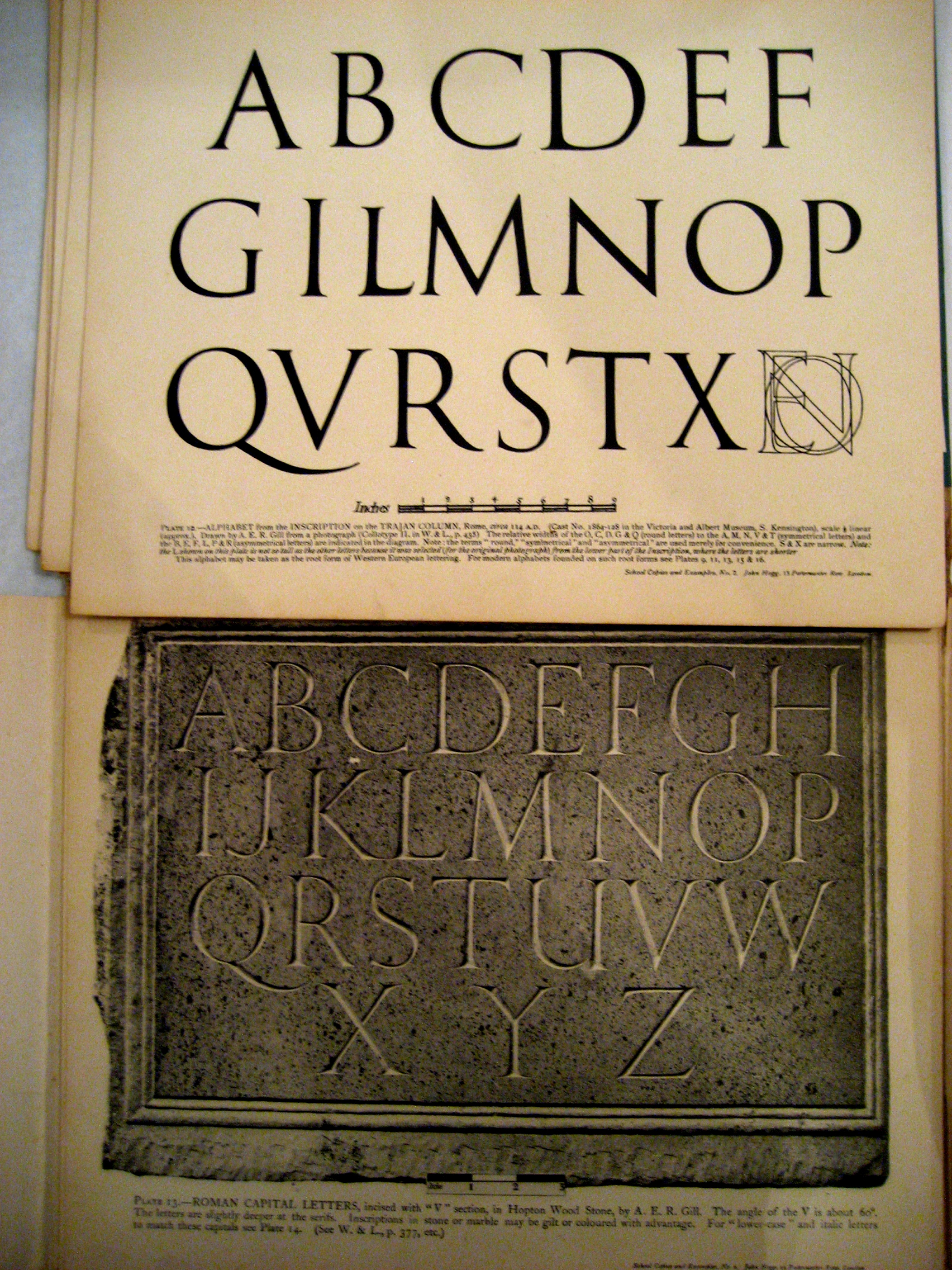
A drawing and photographed carving by Gill of the "Trajan" capitals on Trajan's Column in Rome, a model for the capitals of Gill Sans and Johnson. Respected by Arts and Crafts artisans as among the best ever drawn, many signs and lettering projects created with an intentionally artistic design are based on them.

The uppercase of Gill Sans is partly modelled on Roman capitals, such as those found on Trajan's Column in Rome, with considerable variation in width. These had become a standard for inscriptional lettering in Britain at the time: Gill's teacher Edward Johnston had written that "the Roman capitals have held the supreme place among letters for readableness and beauty. They are the best forms for the grandest and most important inscriptions."

While Gill Sans is not based on purely geometric principles to the extent of the geometric sans-serifs that had preceded it, some aspects of Gill Sans do have a geometric feel. (Note: Although it is now common to classify Gill Sans and Futura as following separate directions in typeface design, humanist and geometric, this did not seem obvious to contemporary writers who often saw both as a new, more personalised development of the sans-serif letter. Some sources of the period distinguish sans-serifs into the "grotesques" of the nineteenth century and the modern "sans-serifs" of the twentieth, or similar classification structures.) The J descends below the baseline, the "O" is an almost perfect circle, and the capital "M" is based on the proportions of a square with the middle strokes meeting at the centre; this was not inspired by Roman carving, but is very similar to Johnston. (Note: Mosley writes that it is "tempting to speculate" that this may have been Gill's idea even in the Johnston type, since it does not resemble Johnston's calligraphy, although there are naturally many past precedents for the design in signpainting and type.) The "E" and "F" are also relatively narrow.

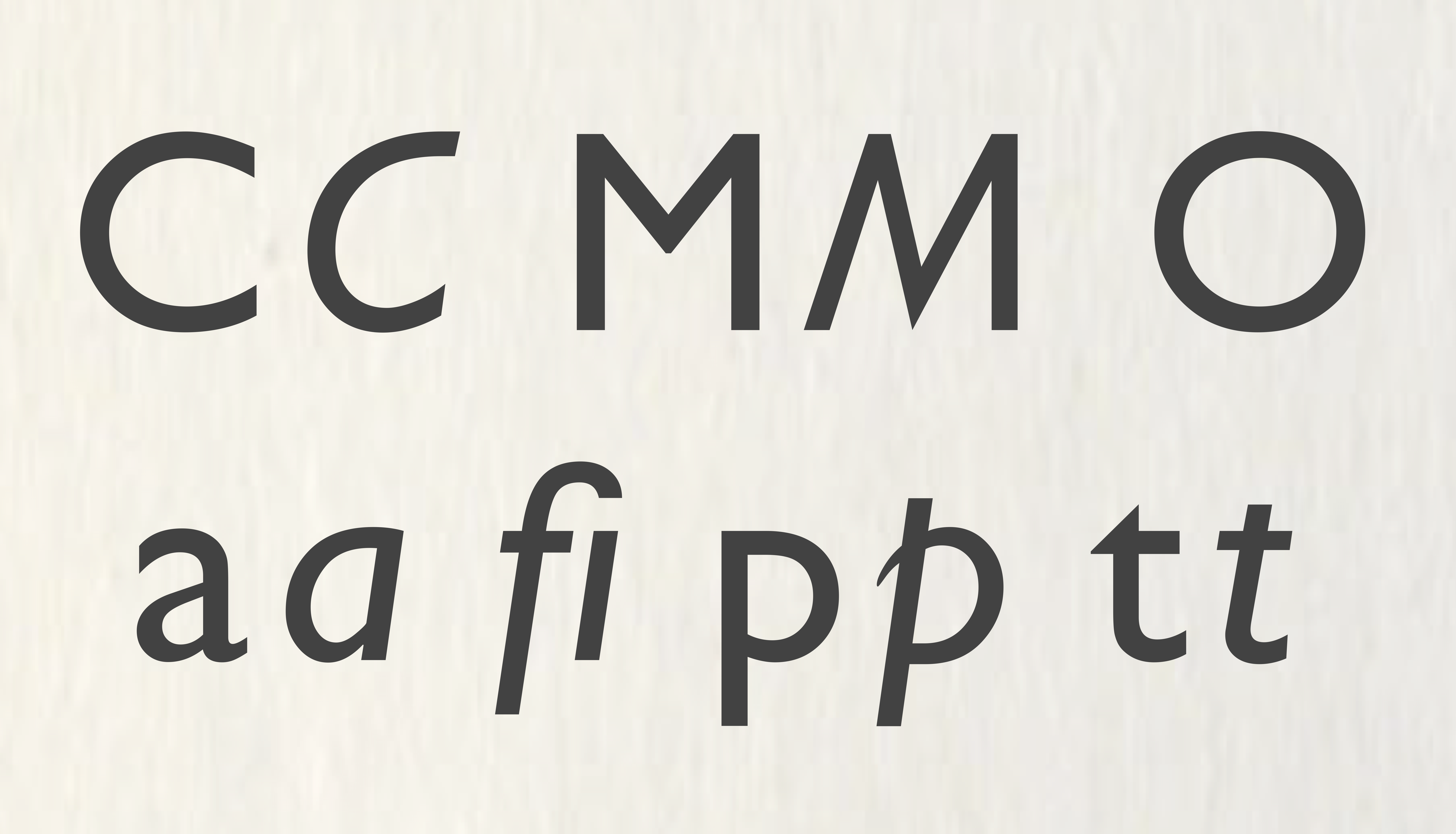
Distinctive characters of Gill Sans

The influence of traditional serif letters is also clear in the "two-storey" lower-case "a" and "g", unlike that of Futura, and the "t" with its curve to bottom right and slanting cut at top left, unlike Futura's, which is simply formed from two straight lines. The lower-case "a" also narrows strikingly towards the top of its loop, which is common in serif designs but rarer in sans-serifs.

Following the traditional serif model, the italic has different letterforms from the roman, where many sans-serifs simply slant the letters in what is called an oblique style. This is clearest in the "a", which becomes a "single storey" design similar to handwriting, and the lower-case "p", which has a calligraphic tail on the left reminiscent of italics, such as those cut by William Caslon in the eighteenth century. The italic "e" is more restrained, with a straight line on the underside of the bowl where serif fonts normally add a curve. (Note: Morison had argued for the theory that an oblique made a better match than an italic to an upright font through offering less of a contrast to it. This contention had been a major part of the protracted and tense development of the Perpetua project, begun before Gill Sans but released second, since Monotype management scrapped the oblique for a more normal italic. Morison ultimately abandoned the idea and ruefully noted that Times New Roman had an italic that owed "more to Didot than dogma.") Like most serif fonts, several weights and releases of Gill Sans use ligatures to allow its expansive letter "f" to join up with or avoid colliding with following letters.

The basic letter shapes of Gill Sans do not appear consistent across styles (or even in the metal type era all the sizes of the same style), especially in the Extra Bold and Extra Condensed widths, while the Ultra Bold style is effectively a different design altogether and was originally marketed as such. Digital-period Monotype designer Dan Rhatigan, author of an article on Gill Sans's development after Gill's death, said that "Gill Sans grew organically ... [it] takes a very 'asystematic' approach to type. Very characteristic of when it was designed and of when it was used." At this time, the idea that sans-serif typefaces should form a consistent family, with glyph shapes as consistent as possible between all weights and sizes, had not fully developed; it was normal for families to vary as seemed appropriate for their weight until developments such as the groundbreaking release of Univers in 1957.

In the light weights, the slanting cut at top left of the regular "t" is replaced with two separate strokes. (Note: This is necessary since the slanting cut would unbalance the letter if the stroke weights were lighter.) From the bold weight upwards, Gill Sans has an extremely eccentric design of "i" and "j", with the dots smaller than their parent letter's stroke.

== Development ==
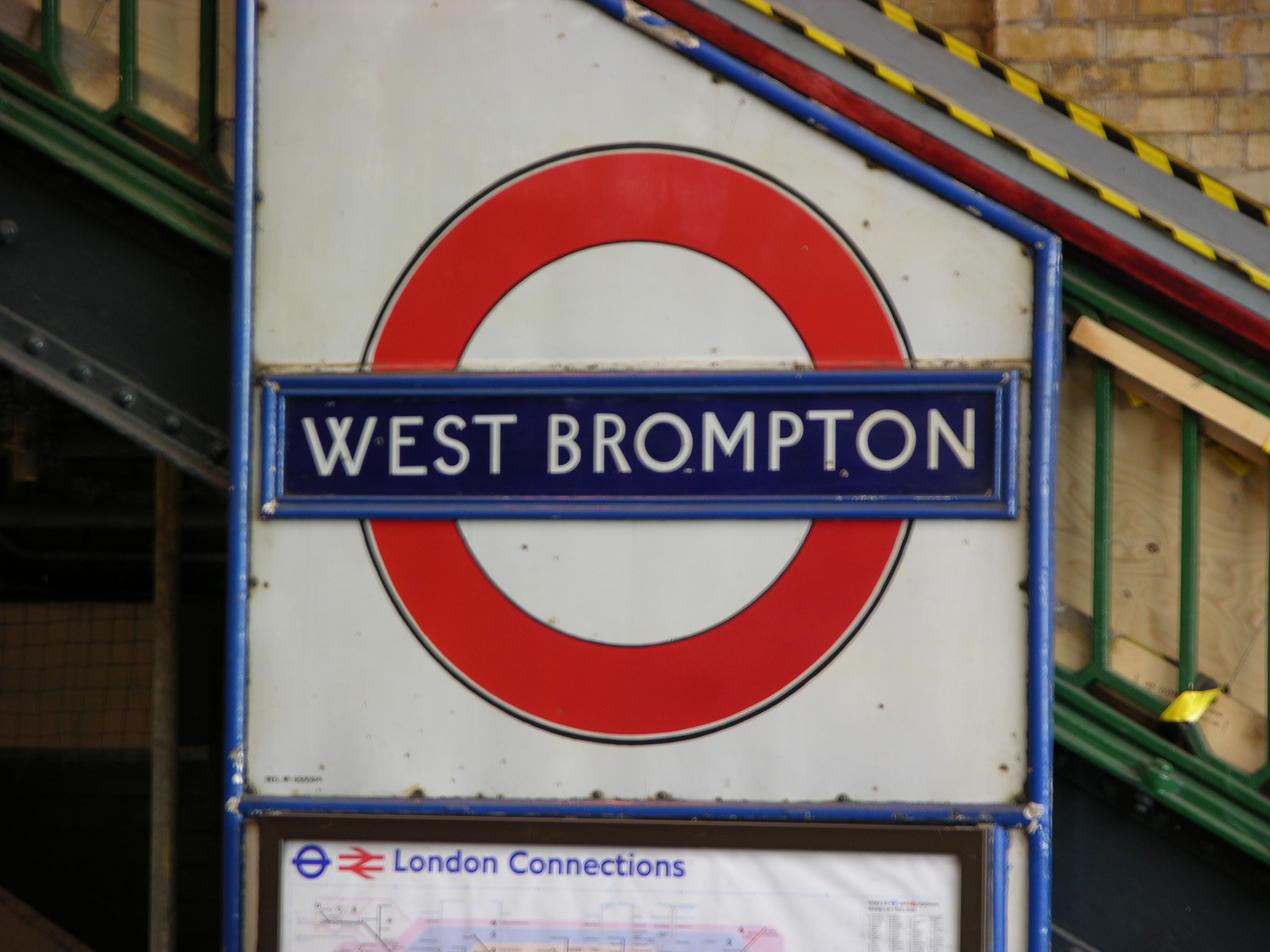
An early version of Johnston on a London Underground metal sign. Johnston's design was rendered variably on some older signs; this uses a condensed "R" and four-terminal "W".

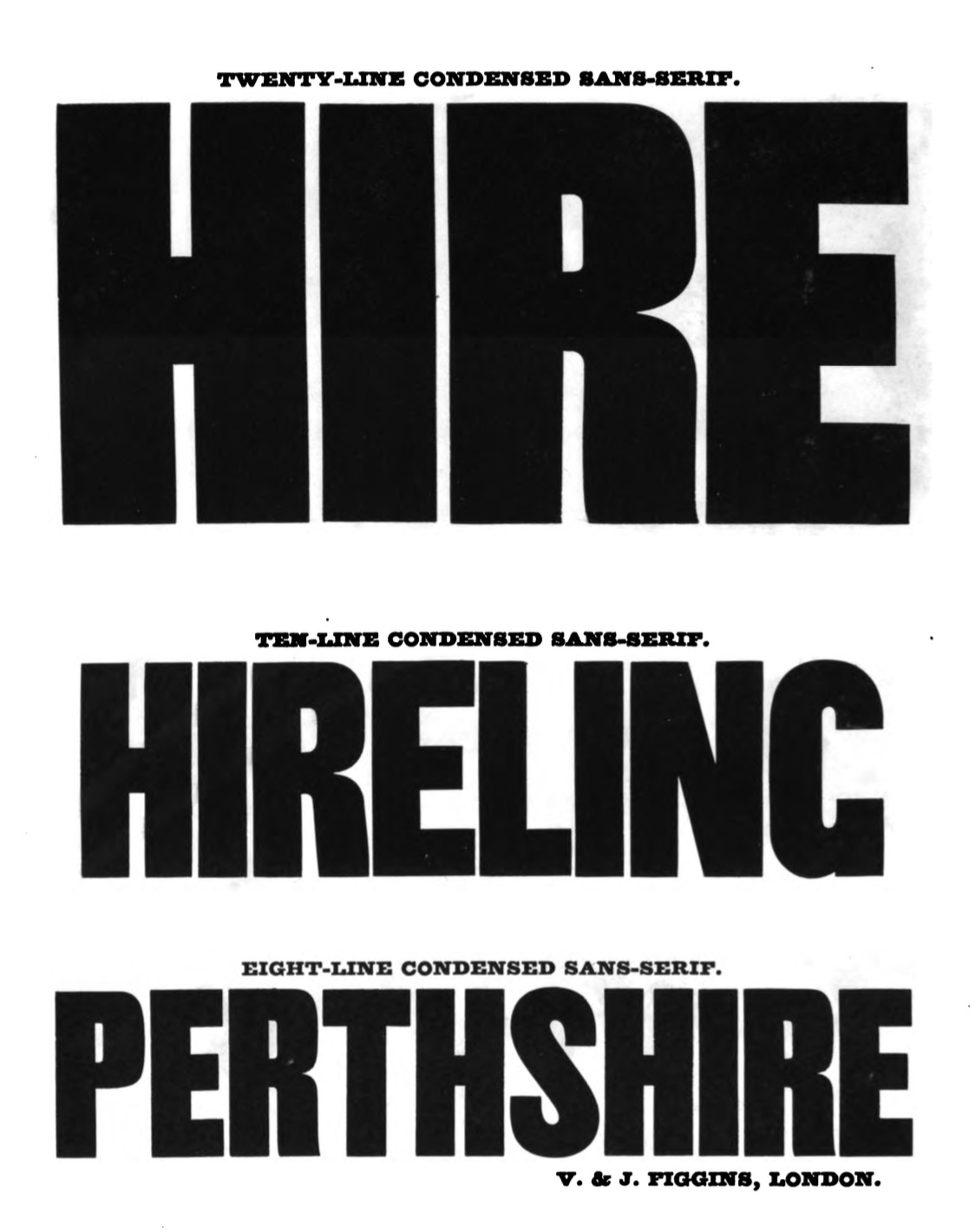
The ultra-bold sans-serifs of the Figgins foundry. Gill and Johnston sought to create sans-serif designs that were modern and not as bold as these. Gill argued in his Essay on Typography that such closed-up forms were counterproductively bold and less legible than lighter fonts of normal proportions.

Morison commissioned Gill to develop Gill Sans after they had begun to work together (often by post since Gill lived in Wales) on Gill's serif design Perpetua in 1925; they had known each other since about 1913. In 1927, Morison visited Cleverdon's bookshop in Bristol, where he was impressed by Gill's fascia and alphabet. Gill wrote that "it was as a consequence of seeing these letters" that Morison commissioned him to develop a sans-serif family. (Note: Cleverdon retained the book of alphabets, which also included model serif capitals and lower-case, before selling it to the Harry Ransom Center collection in 1967.)

In the period during and after his closest collaboration with Johnston, Gill had intermittently worked on sans-serif letter designs, including an almost sans-serif capital design in an alphabet for sign-painters in the 1910s and some capital letter signs around his home in Capel-y-ffin, Wales. (Note: The sign-painter's alphabet had very small wedge serifs, similar to the capitals of Copperplate Gothic and similar designs. This style was occasionally used at the time. Johnston had considered it as a possible structure for the Underground alphabet and it was used on some variants of Johnston by the Underground with the involvement of Johnston's pupil Percy Delf Smith.) Gill had greatly admired Johnston's work on their Underground project, which he later wrote had "redeemed the whole business of sans-serif from its nineteenth-century corruption" of extreme boldness. Johnston apparently had not tried to turn the alphabet (as it was then called) that he had designed into a commercial typeface project. He had tried to get involved in type design before starting work on Johnston Sans, but without success since the industry at the time mostly created designs in-house. Morison similarly respected the design of the Underground system, one of the first and most lasting uses of a standard lettering style as corporate branding (Gill had designed a set of serif letters for WH Smith), writing that it "conferred upon [the lettering] a sanction, civic and commercial, as had not been accorded to an alphabet since the time of Charlemagne".

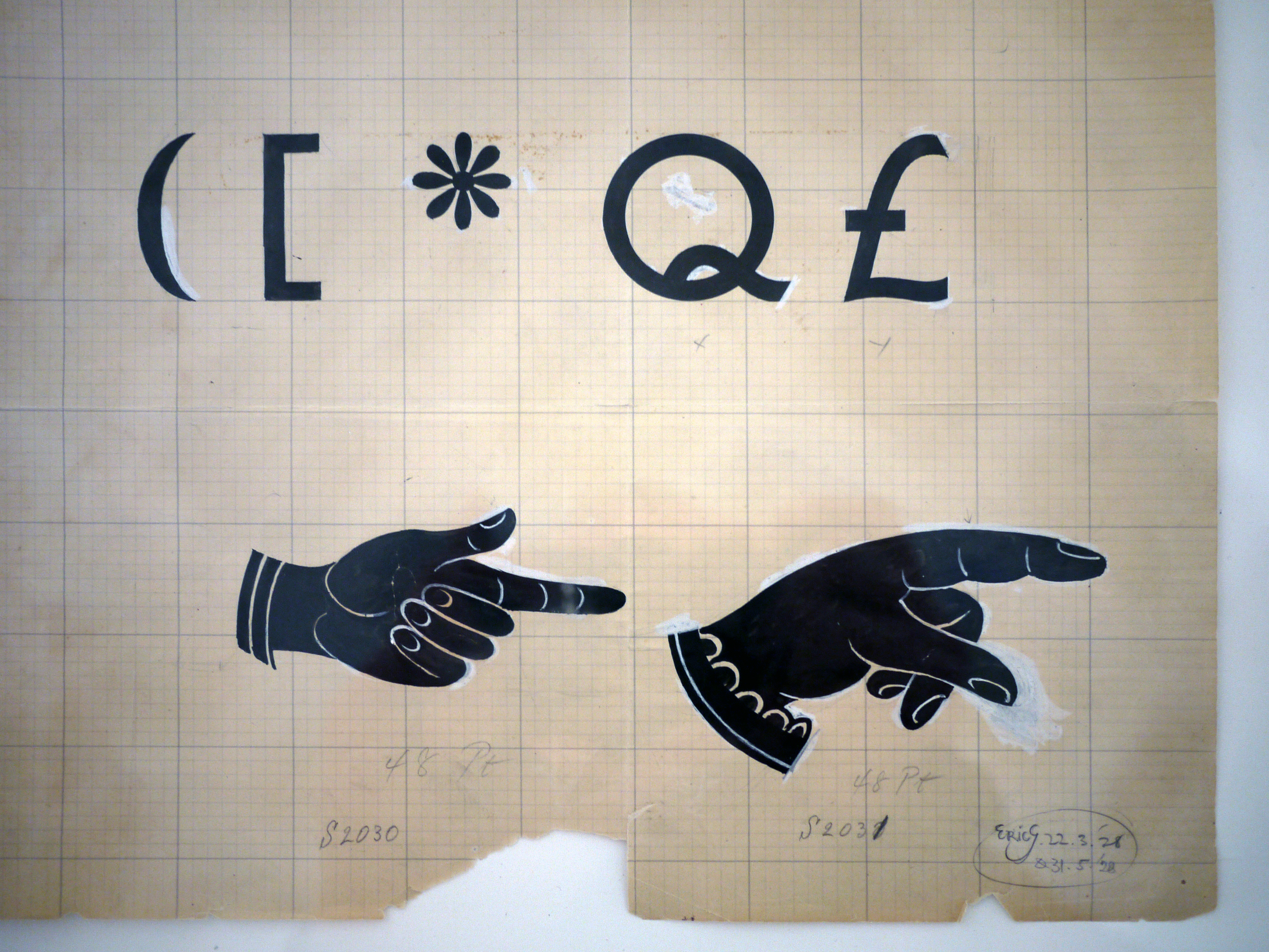
Some of Gill's original art for Gill Sans, showing the original "Q", punctuation and two manicules

Morison and Gill had met with some resistance within Monotype while developing Perpetua, and while Morison was an enthusiastic backer of the project, Monotype's engineering manager and type designer Frank Hinman Pierpont was deeply unconvinced, commenting that he could "see nothing in this design to recommend it and much that is objectionable". (Pierpont was the creator of Monotype's previous mainstay sans-serif, a loose family now called Monotype Grotesque. It is a much less sculptured design inspired by German sans-serifs.) Morison also intervened to insist that the letters "J" and "Q" be allowed to elegantly descend below the baseline, something not normal for titling typefaces that were often made to fill up the entire area of the metal type. In the early days of its existence, it was not always consistently simply called "Gill Sans", with other names such as "Gill Sans-serif", "Monotype Sans-Serif" (the latter two both used by Gill in some of his publications) or its order numbers (such as Series No. 231) sometimes used.

A large amount of material about the development of Gill Sans survives in Monotype's archives and in Gill's papers. While the capitals (which were prepared first) resemble Johnston quite closely, the archives document Gill (and the drawing office team at Monotype's works in Salfords, Surrey, mentioned in Women in Type, who developed a final precise design and spacing) grappling with the challenge of creating a viable humanist sans-serif lower-case as well as an italic, which Johnston's design did not have. (Note: Some revivals of Johnston, such as a project by Berthold Wolpe, the ITC digitisation and that used by Transport for London have attempted to synthesise an italic or oblique for Johnston, but Johnston never created one. P22's revival declined to add one.) Gill's first draft proposed many slanting cuts on the ends of ascenders and descenders (resembling Johnston less than the released version), the latter of which were quite long.

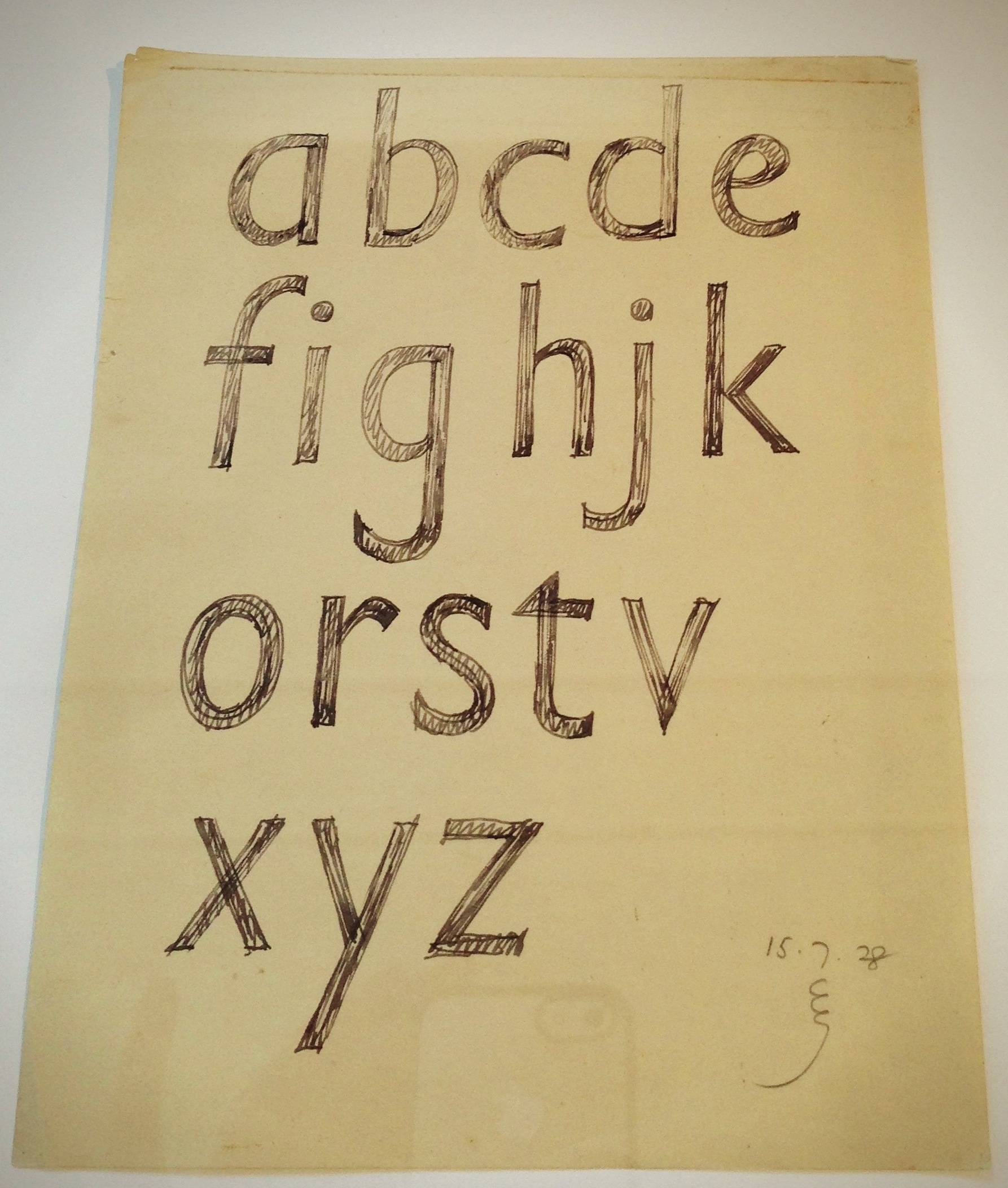
An early design for the italic lower case with long descenders, and italic caps with swashes dated nine days later

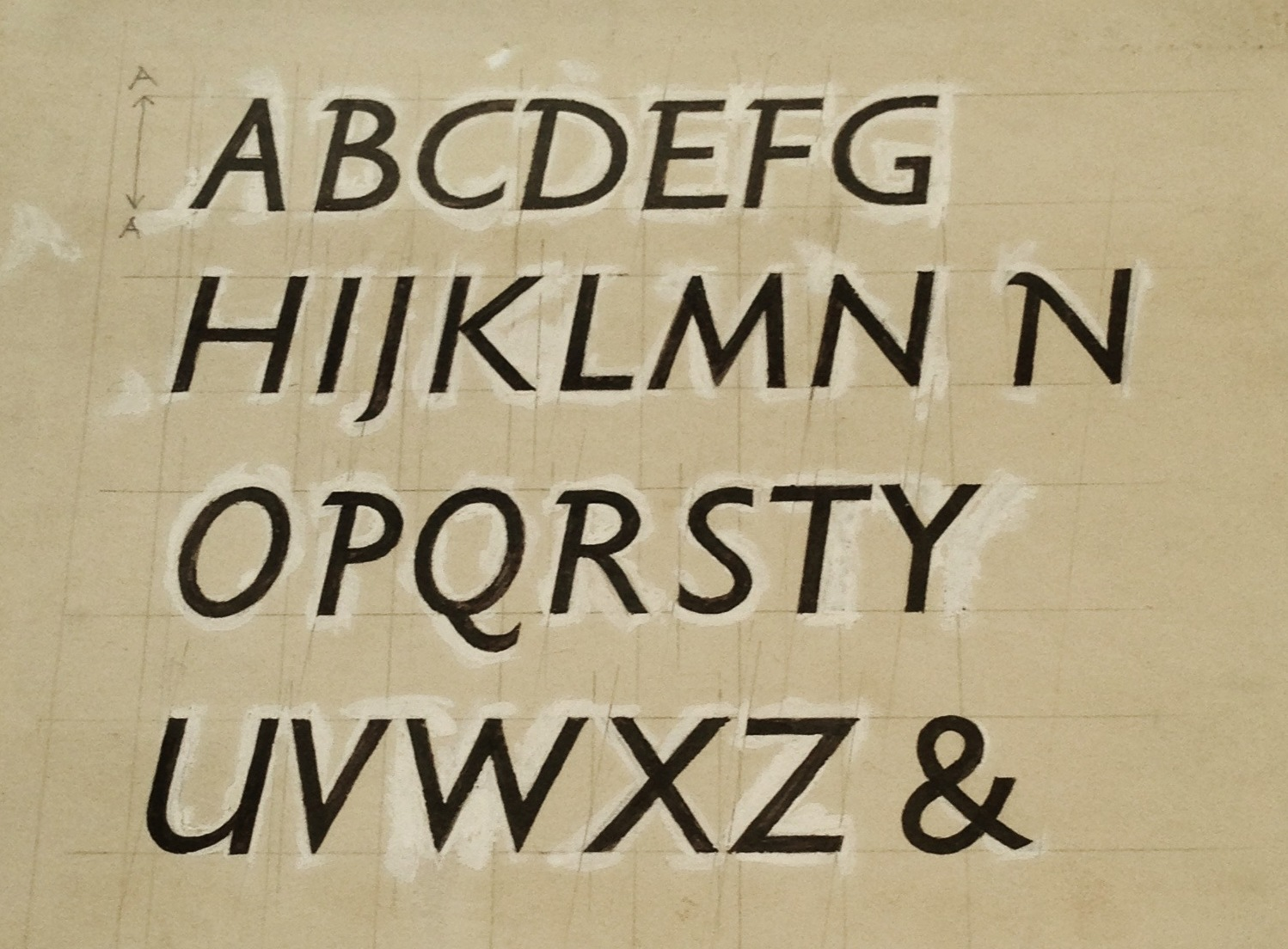

Early art for the italic also looked very different, with less of a slope, very long descenders, and swash capitals. (Note: This resulted in a design somewhat similar to Goudy Sans of a few years later. The development of Johnston had gone through a similar paring-down process a decade earlier, in which the idea of incorporating many calligraphy-influenced glyphs, like a capital-form "q" in the lower-case, was considered then abandoned.) The final version did not use the calligraphic italic "g" that Gill preferred in his serif designs Perpetua and Joanna (and considered in the draft italic art), instead using a standard "double-storey" "g".

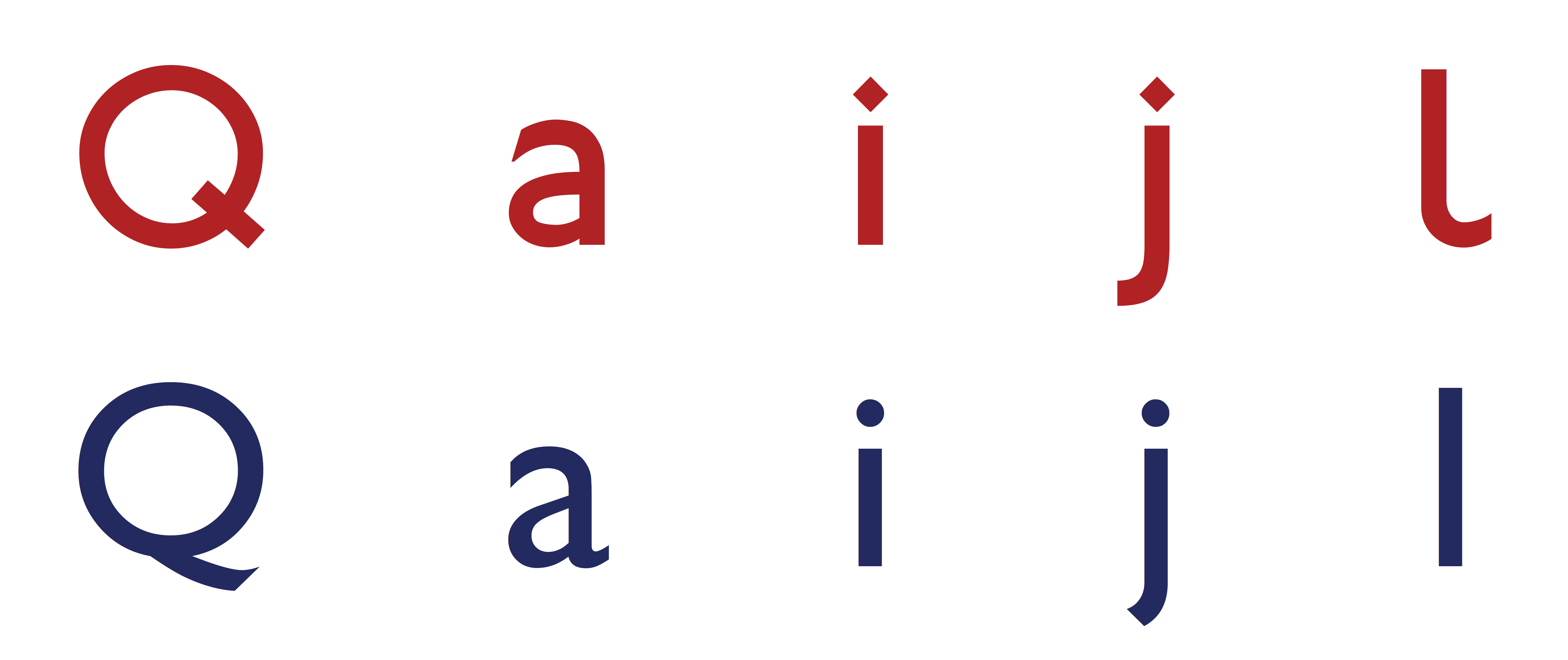
Johnston (upper) and Gill Sans (lower), showing some of the most distinctive differences

In the regular or roman style of Gill Sans, some letters were simplified from Johnston, with diamond dots becoming round (rectangles in the later light weight) and the lower-case "L" becoming a simple line. However, the "a" became more complex, with a curving tail in most versions and sizes. In addition, the design was simply refined in general, such as by making the horizontals slightly narrower than verticals so that they would not appear unbalanced, a standard technique in font design which Johnston had not used. The "R" with its widely splayed leg was Gill's preferred design, unlike that of Johnston; historian James Mosley has suggested that this may be inspired by an Italian Renaissance carving in the Victoria and Albert Museum in London.

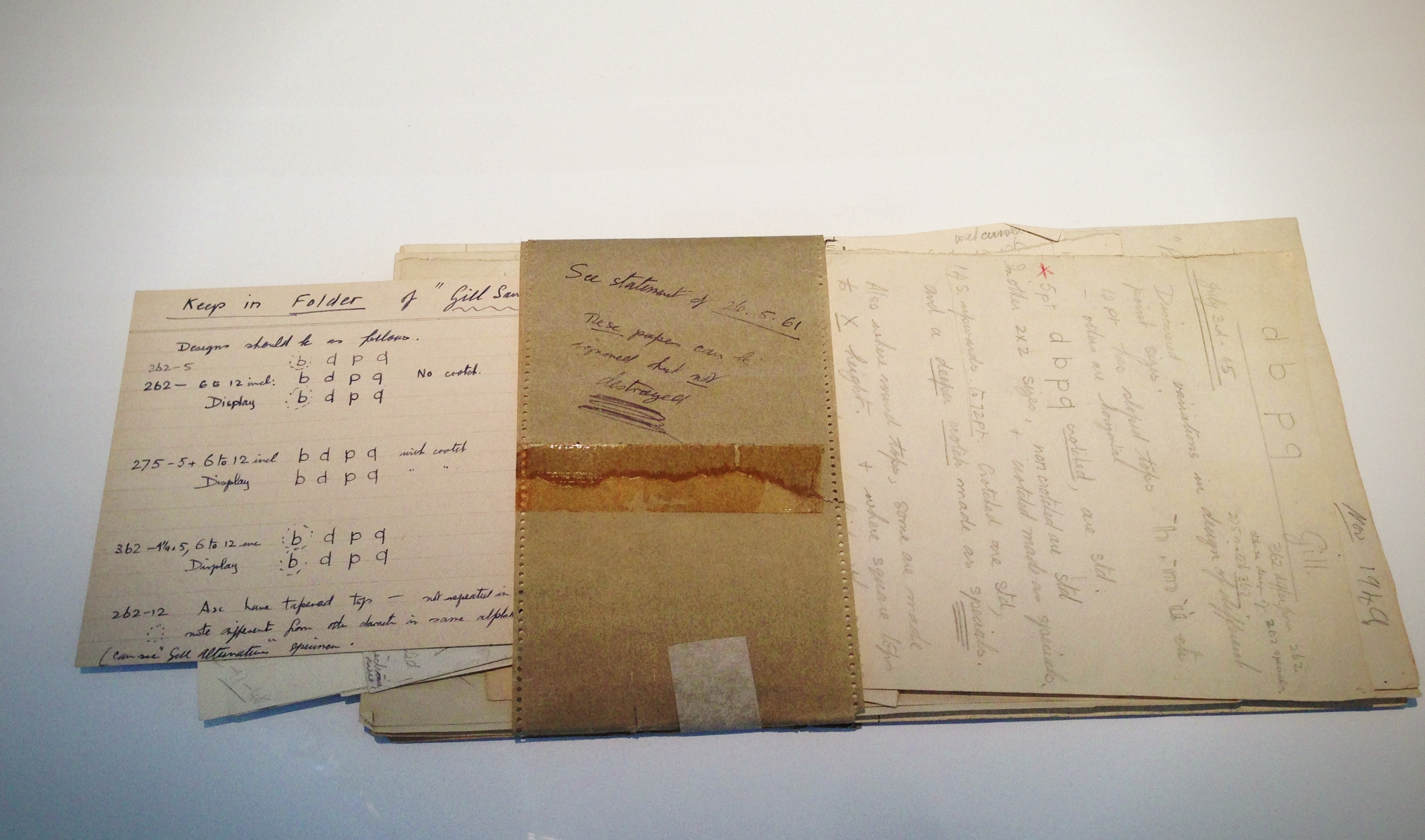
1940s notes from Monotype's records discuss the different drawings used for the bdpq characters

Particular areas of thought during the design process were the "a" (several versions and sizes in the hot metal era had a straight tail, like Johnston's, or a mildly curving tail), "b", "d", "p" and "q", where some versions (and sizes, since the same weight would not be identical at every size) had stroke ends visible and others did not. (Note: An accessible specimen showing this is the Monotype Recorder article on the LNER timetable, which prints the sizes and weights the LNER favoured: stroke ends are visible on the 18 pt medium on "d", "p" and "q", but not at 10 pt.) Rhatigan has commented that Monotype's archives contain "enough [material] for a book just about the 'b', 'd', 'p', and 'q' of Gill Sans".

The titling capitals of Gill Sans were first unveiled at a printing conference in 1928; it was also shown in a specimen issued in the Fleuron magazine, edited by Morison. While initial response was partly appreciative, it was still considered dubious by some ultra-conservative printers who saw all sans-serif type as modern and unsound; one called it "typographical Bolshevism". Sans-serifs were still regarded as vulgar and commercial by purists in this period. Johnston's pupil Graily Hewitt privately commented that:

In Johnston I have lost confidence. Despite all he did for us ... he has undone too much by forsaking his standard of the Roman alphabet, giving the world, without safeguard or explanation, his block letters which disfigure our modern life. His prestige has obscured their vulgarity and commercialism.

Nonetheless, Gill Sans rapidly became popular after its release.

Gill Sans' technical production followed Monotype's standard method of the period. The characters were drawn mirrored on paper in large plan diagrams by the drawing office team, led and trained by Pierpont and Fritz Steltzer, both of whom Monotype had recruited from the German printing industry. The drawing staff who executed the design was disproportionately female; they worked out many aspects of the final drawings including adaptations of the letters to different sizes and the spacing. The diagrams were then used as a plan for machining metal punches by pantograph to stamp matrices, which would be loaded into a casting machine to cast type. It was Monotype's standard practice at the time to first engrave a limited number of characters and print proofs (some of which survive) from them to test overall balance of colour and spacing on the page, before completing the remaining characters. Rhatigan, Walter Tracy, and Gill's biographer Malcolm Yorke have all written that the drawing office's work in making Gill Sans successful has not been fully appreciated. Yorke described Gill as "tactless" in his claims that the design was "as much as possible mathematically measurable ... as little reliance as possible should be placed on the sensibility of the draughtsmen and others concerned in its machine facture".

=== Reception ===
Gill Sans rapidly became very popular. Its success was aided by Monotype's sophisticated marketing, led by Gill's supporter Beatrice Warde, and due to its practicality and availability for machine composition in a very wide range of sizes and weights.

Despite the popularity of Gill Sans, some reviews were critical. Robert Harling, who knew Gill, wrote in his 1976 anthology examining Gill's lettering that the density of the basic weight made it unsuitable for extended passages of text, printing a passage with it as a demonstration. The regular weight has been used to print body text for some trade printing uses, such as guides to countryside walks published by the LNER. William Addison Dwiggins described it and Futura as "fine in the capitals and bum in the lower-case" while proposing to create Metro, a more individualistic competitor, for Linotype around 1929. Modern writers, including Stephen Coles and Ben Archer, have criticised it for failing to improve on Johnston and for unevenness of colour, especially in the bolder weights. More generally, modern font designer Jonathan Hoefler has criticised Johnston and Gill's designs for rigidity, calling their work "products more of the machine than the hand, chilly and austere designs shaped by unbending rules, whose occasional moments of whimsy were so out of place as to feel volatile and disquieting".

Gill broached the topic of the similarity with Johnston in a variety of ways in his work and writings, writing to Johnston in 1933 to apologise for the typeface bearing his name and describing Johnston's work as being important and seminal. However, in his Essay on Typography, he proposed that his version was "perhaps an improvement" and more "fool-proof" than Johnston's. Johnston and Gill had drifted apart by the beginning of the 1920s, something Gill's biographer Fiona MacCarthy described as partly due to the anti-Catholicism of Johnston's wife Greta. Frank Pick, the Underground Electric Railways Company managing director who commissioned Johnston's typeface, privately believed Gill Sans to be "a rather close copy" of Johnston's work.

=== Expansion and new styles ===
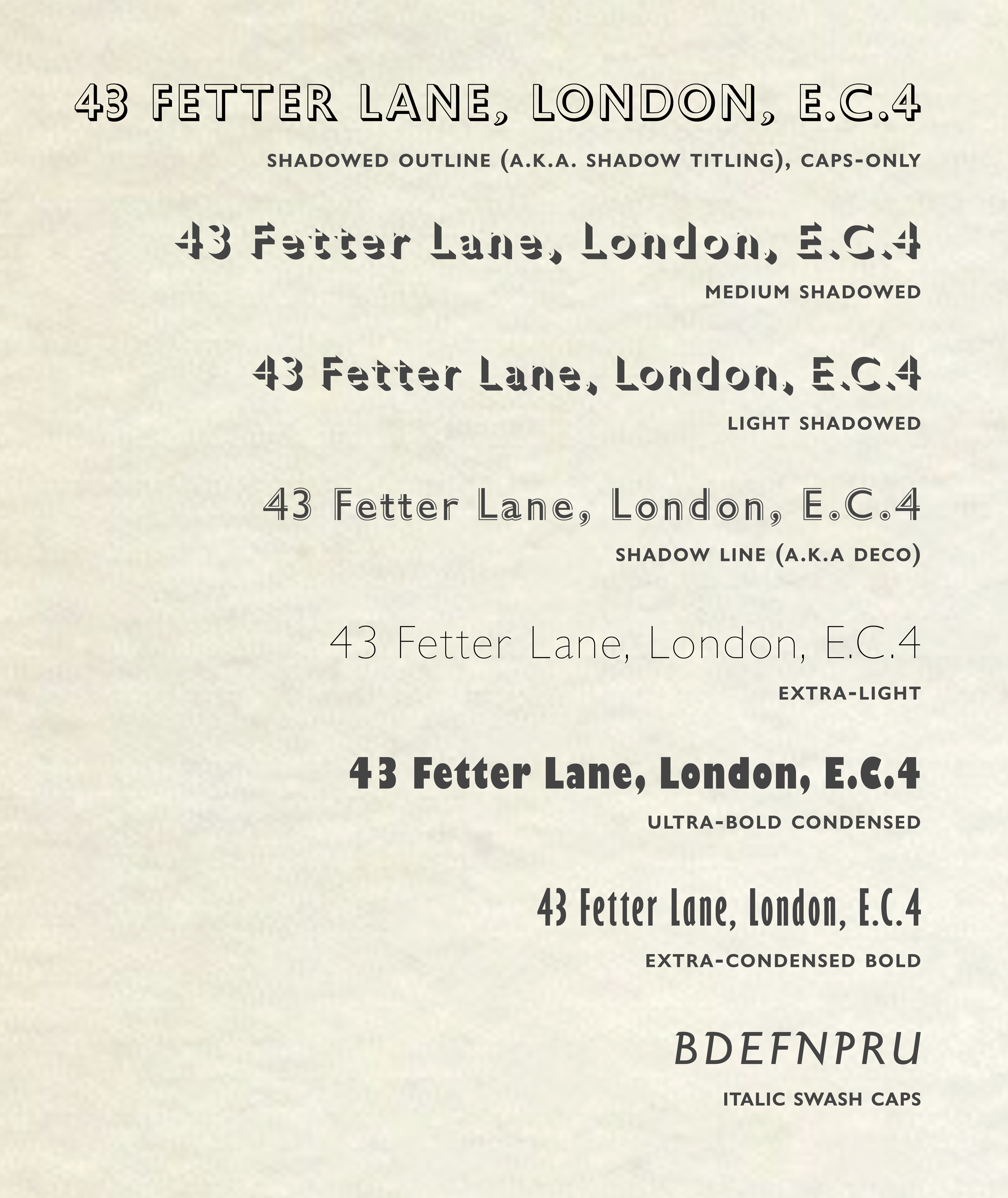
Some of the fonts of the Gill Sans family that are mostly intended for display use. Detail differences are obvious, especially the "single-storey" "a" on Extra Condensed Bold.

Following the initial success of Gill Sans, Monotype rapidly produced a wide variety of other variants. In addition, Monotype sold moulds (matrices) for Gill Sans in very large sizes for their "Supercaster" type-casting equipment. Popular with advertisers, this allowed end-users to cast their own type at a very competitive price. This made it a popular choice for posters. Gill's biographer Malcolm Yorke described it as "the essence of clarity for public notices".

Versions of Gill Sans were created in a wide range of styles, such as condensed and shadowed weights. Several shadowed designs were released, including a capitals-only regular shadowed design and a light-shadowed version with deep relief shadows. In the metal type era, a "cameo ruled" design that placed white letters in boxes or against a stippled black background was available. The shadowed weights were intended to be used together with the regular, printing in different colours, to achieve a simple multicolour effect. Some of the decorative versions may predominantly have been designed by the Monotype office, with Gill examining, critiquing and approving the designs sent to him by post. The long series of extensions, redrawings and conversions into new formats of one of Monotype's most important assets (extending long beyond Gill's death) has left Gill Sans with a great range of alternative designs and releases. In 1993, a book weight suitable for body text was created in between the light and regular weight, along with a heavy weight.

=== Gill Kayo ===
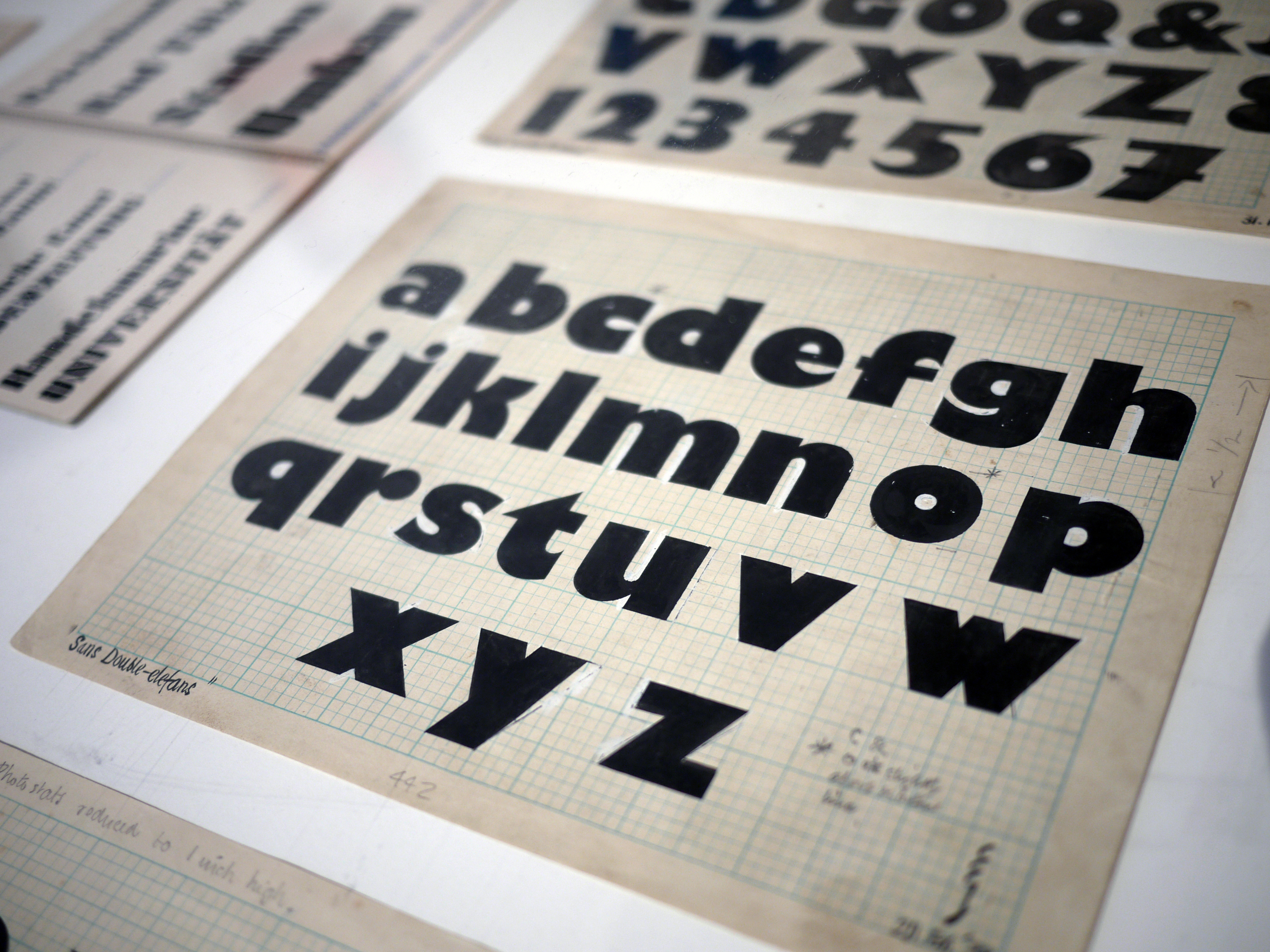
Gill's drawings of Gill Kayo. Its working title "Sans Double Elefans" is visible at bottom left, and his "EG" signature at bottom right.

In 1936, Gill and Monotype released Gill Kayo, an extremely bold sans-serif that took its name from "KO", or knockout, implying its aggressive build. It has often been branded as Gill Sans Ultra Bold, even though many of its letters vary considerably from the original Gill Sans. Gill, who thought of the design as something of a joke, proposed naming it "Double Elefans". Harling reviewed it as "dismal" and sarcastically commented that "typographical historians of 2000AD (which isn't, after all, so very far away) will find this odd outburst in Mr Gill's career, and will spend much time in attempting to track down this sad psychological state of his during 1936." Forty years later, he described it as "the most horrendous and blackguardly of these display exploitations". Work on the font began in 1932; some of the first drawings may have been prepared by Gill's son-in-law Denis Tegetmeier. Gill Kayo made a return to popularity in graphic design during the 1970s and 1980s, when Letraset added a condensed weight.

The boldest weights of Gill Sans, including Kayo, have been particularly criticised for design issues such as the eccentric design of the dots on the "i" and "j", and for their extreme boldness (Gill Sans' standard weight is, as already noted, already quite bold by modern standards). Gill argued in his Essay on Typography that the nineteenth-century tendency to make sans-serif typefaces attention-grabbingly bold was self-defeating, since the result was compromised legibility. In the closing paragraph, he ruefully noted his contribution to the genre:

There are now about as many different varieties of letters as there are different kinds of fools. I myself am responsible for designing five different sorts of sans-serif letters – each one thicker and fatter than the last because each advertisement has to try and shout down its neighbours.

=== Alternative characters ===
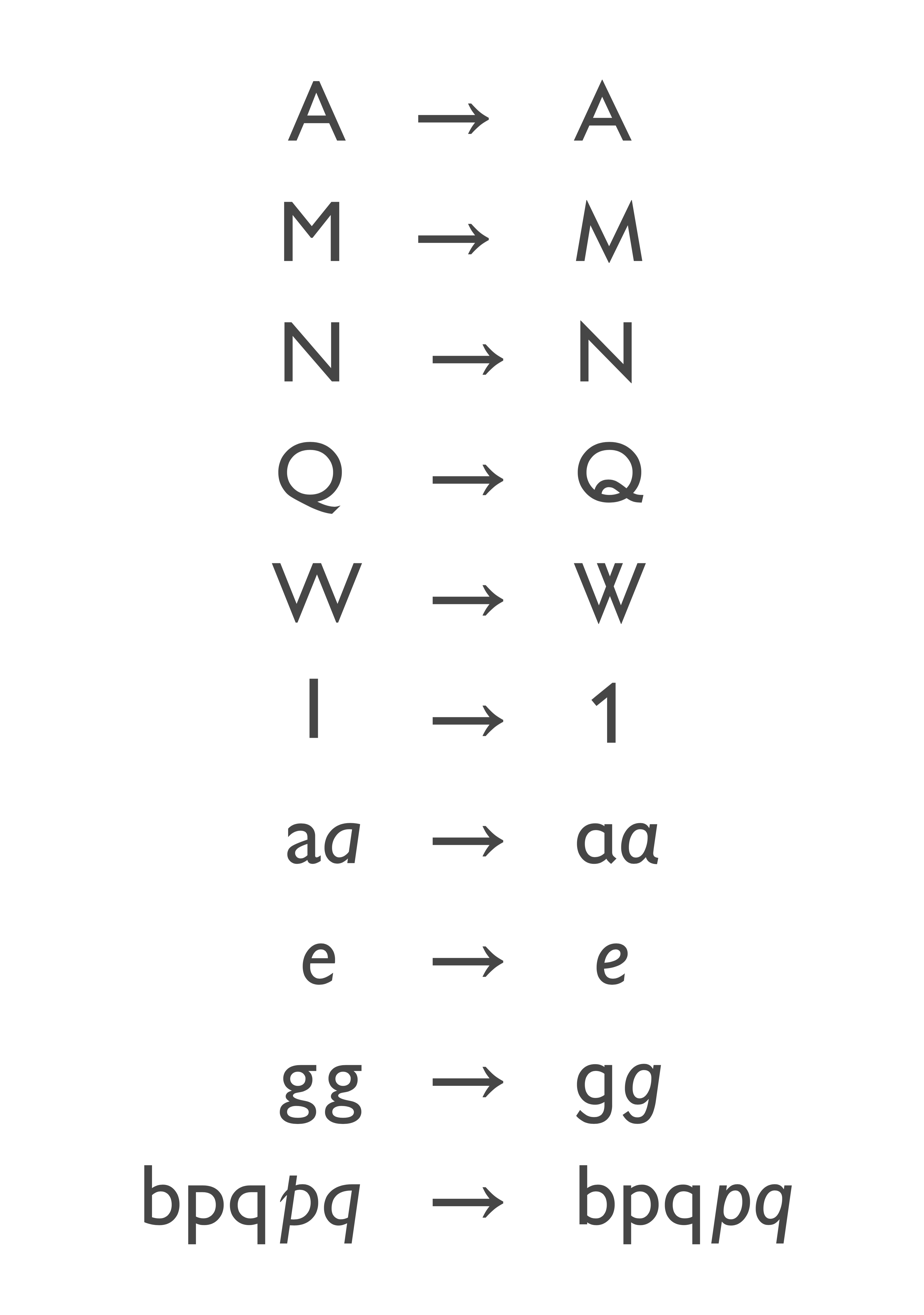
Alternative characters in Gill Sans Nova, most or all based on those offered in the metal type era

Monotype developed a set of alternative characters for Gill Sans to cater to differing tastes and national printing styles of different countries. These include Futura-inspired designs of "N", "M", "R", "a", "g", "t" and others, a four-terminal "W" in the French renaissance style, a tighter "R", a "Q" in the nineteenth-century style with a tail that looped upwards (similar to that on Century among others, and used by the LNER), oblique designs as opposed to the standard true italic, a more curving, true-italic "e", and several alternative numerals. In the standard designs for Gill Sans, the numeral "1", upper-case "i" and lower-case "L" are all a simple vertical line, so an alternative "1" with a serif was sold for number-heavy situations where this could otherwise cause confusion, such as on price-lists (not all timetables used it: for example, the LNER used the simple version). Some early versions of Gill Sans also had features later abandoned, such as an unusual "7" matching the curve of the "9", a "5" pushing forwards, and a lower-case letter-height "0".

Gill was involved in the design of these alternatives, and Monotype's archive has preserved notes in which he rethought the geometric alternatives. With the increasing popularity of Futura, Gill Sans was not alone in being adapted; both Erbar and Dwiggins' Metro would undergo what historian Paul Shaw has called a "Futura-ectomy" to conform to taste. After Gill's death, Monotype created versions for the Greek and Cyrillic alphabets. (Note: Gerry Leonidas of the University of Reading, a leading expert on the history of Greek printing, has criticised Gill Sans' Greek characters, at least in versions up to 2002, as "seriously compromised" and unidiomatic, although he noted that it was nonetheless widely imitated around the 1950s.) Monotype also added additional features not found in the metal type, notably text figures and small capitals.

=== Series and styles ===
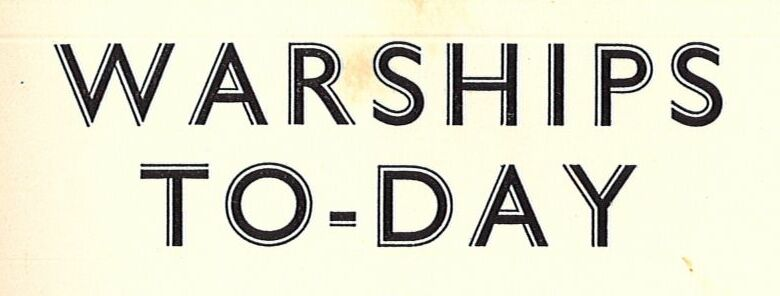
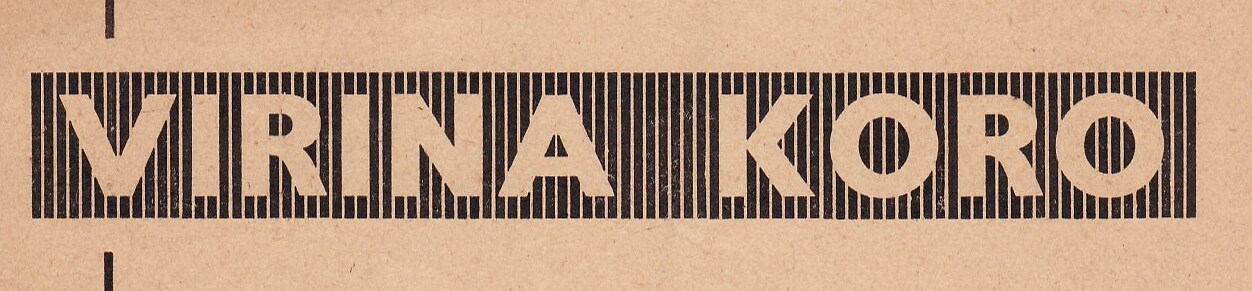
Two of the most obscure members of the Gill Sans family shown on 1930s books: left: Gill Sans Shadow Line, not available in an official digitisation until 2015, and right: Gill Sans Cameo Ruled, yet to be officially digitised.

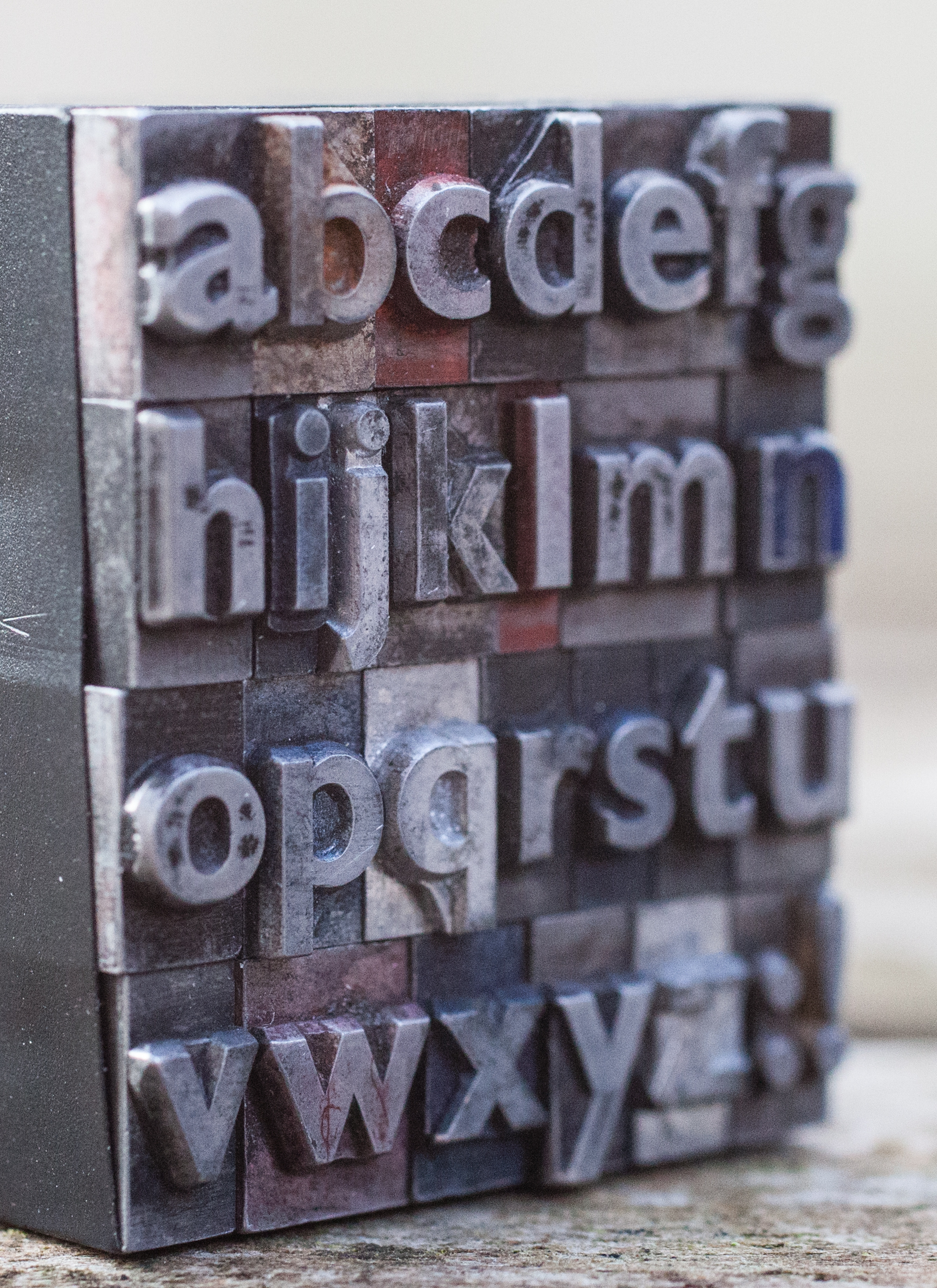
Metal type for Gill Sans Bold (mirrored image)

According to Rhatigan and other sources, Gill Sans had been released in the following styles by the end of the metal type period (not all sold at the same time):

- Gill Sans Titling (1928, series 231)
- Gill Sans (1930, series 262, sometimes called Gill Sans Medium)
- Gill Sans Bold (1930, series 275)
- Gill Sans Shadow Line (1931, series 290) (Note: Digitised in Gill Sans Nova as Gill Sans Nova Deco Regular.)
- Gill Sans Shadow Titling (1931, series 304) (Note: Digitised as Gill Sans Shadowed and Gill Sans Nova Shadowed Outline. Capitals-only, as a titling face. Similar to Hans Bohn's Orplid face of a few years earlier.)
- Gill Sans Bold Titling (1931, series 317)
- Gill Sans Extra Bold (1931, series 321)
- Gill Sans Light (1931, series 362) (Note: Sometimes sold as Gill Sans Extra Light.)
- Gill Sans Shadow (1932, series 338) (Note: Could be combined with Gill Sans Regular printed in a different colour to achieve a shadowed effect. By the late metal type period sold as Gill Sans Shadow No. 3, as the heaviest shadowed weight, despite being cut first.)
- Gill Sans Bold Condensed (1932, series 343)
- Gill Sans 5pt (1932, series 349, sometimes called Gill Sans No. 2)
- Gill Sans Bold 5pt (1932, series 350, sometimes called Bold No. 2)
- Gill Sans Poster (1932, series 353)
- Gill Sans Bold Condensed Titling (1933, series 373)
- Gill Sans Cameo (1934, series 233)
- Gill Sans Cameo Ruled (1935, series 299)
- Gill Sans Shadow No. 1 (1936, series 406) (Note: The lightest Gill Sans Shadow weight, digitised as Gill Sans Light Shadowed and Gill Sans Nova Shadowed Light.)
- Gill Sans Shadow No. 2 (1936, series 408) (Note: A slightly bolder shadowed weight.)
- Gill Sans Ultra Bold (1936, series 442)
- Gill Sans Bold Extra Condensed (1937, series 468)
- Gill Sans Condensed (1937, series 485, sometimes called Medium Condensed)
- Gill Sans Bold No. 3 (1937, series 575)
- Gill Sans Bold Condensed Titling (1939, series 525)
- Gill Sans Extra Bold Titling (1939, series 526)
- Gill Sans Light 5pt (1958, series 662, sometimes called Light No. 2)

Titling series were capitals-only.

=== Phototypesetting ===
Monotype offered Gill Sans on film in the phototypesetting period. The fonts released in 1961 included Light 362, Series 262, Bold 275, Extra Bold 321, Condensed 343, all of which were released in film matrix sets "A" (6–7 points) and "B" (8–22, 24 points).

=== Infant and rounded versions ===
Monotype created an infant version of Gill Sans using single-storey "a" and "g", and other more distinguishable characters, such as a rounded "y", seriffed "1" and lower-case "L" with a turn at the bottom. Infant designs of fonts are often used in education and toys, as the letters, being based on handwriting, are thought to be more recognisable to children, and are often produced to supplement popular families such as Gill Sans, Akzidenz-Grotesk and Bembo. Monotype also created a version with rounded stroke ends for John Lewis for use on toys.

== Digital releases ==
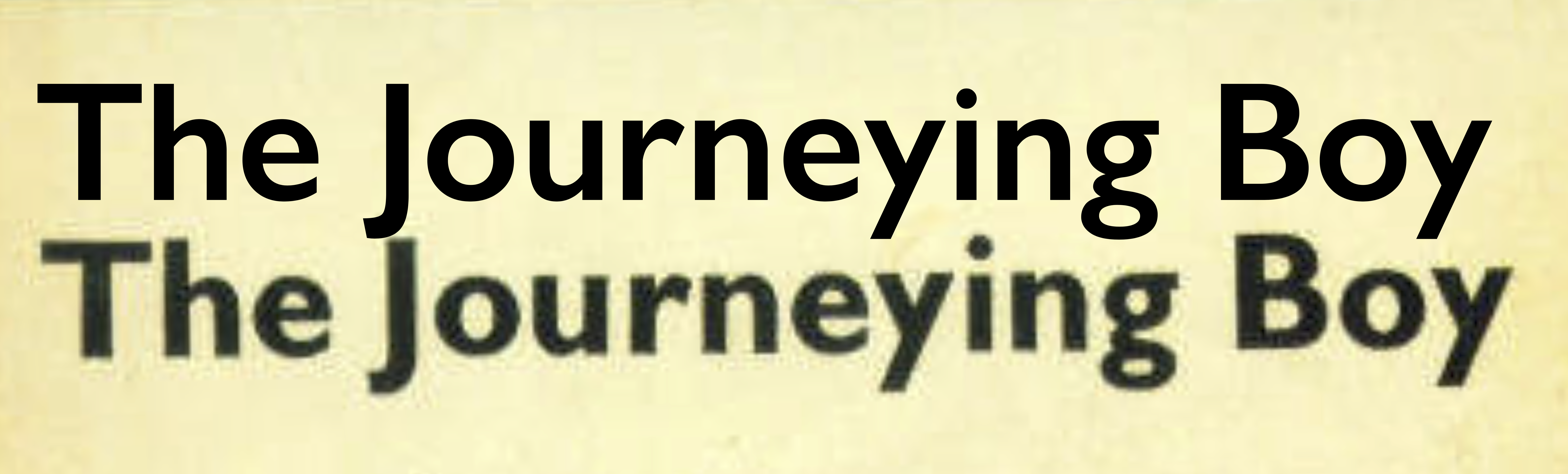
A Penguin Books paperback from 1949 compared to digital Gill Sans MT bold (top) and Gill Sans Nova bold (bottom), showing subtle differences in weight and spacing

The digital releases of Gill Sans fall into several main phases: releases before 2005 (which includes most bundled "system" versions of Gill Sans), the 2005 Pro edition, and the 2015 Nova release which adds many alternative characters and is in part included with Windows 10. In general characteristics for common weights, the designs are similar, but there are some changes: for example, in the book weight, the 2005 release used circular ij dots, but the 2015 release uses square designs and simplifies some ligatures. Digital Gill Sans also gained character sets not present in the metal type, including text figures and small capitals.

Like all metal type revivals, the digital revival of Gill Sans has raised several decisions of interpretation, such as the issue of how to compensate for the ink spread that would have been seen in print at small sizes more than larger. As a result, printed Gill Sans and its digital facsimile may not always match. The digital release of Gill Sans, like many Monotype digitisations, has been criticised, in particular for excessively tight letter-spacing and lack of optical sizes: with only one design released that has to be used at any text size, it cannot replicate the subtlety of design and spacing of the metal type, for which every size was drawn differently. Different font sizes varied in the hot metal era, as is normal for metal type, with wider spacing and other detail changes at smaller text sizes; other major sans-serif families, such as Futura and Akzidenz-Grotesk, are similar. In the phototype period, Monotype continued to offer two or three sizes of master, but this subtlety was lost in the transfer to digital. To replicate this, it is necessary to make manual adjustment to spacing to compensate for size changes, such as expanding the spacing and increasing the weight used at smaller sizes. (Note: Monotype's early digital releases of their classic typefaces, some unlike Gill Sans never fully revisited, were widely seen as erratic: Jonathan Hoefler commented sarcastically that "Gill Sans retired the trophy for 'Worst Digital Adaptation of an Okay Foundry Type', with Bembo & Centaur close behind".)

Former ATypI president John Berry said of Gill Sans' modernised spacing that "both the regular weight and especially the light weight look much better when they're tracked loose". In contrast, Walter Tracy wrote in 1986 that he preferred the later spacing: "the metal version ... was spaced, I suspect, as if it were a serif face".

=== Gill Sans Nova (2015) ===
As of 2019, Monotype's current digitisation of Gill Sans is Gill Sans Nova, by George Ryan. It adds many additional variants, including some of the previously undigitised inline versions, stylistic alternates and an ultra-light weight which had been drawn for Grazia. The fonts differ from Gill Sans MT ("MT" stands for Monotype) in their adoption of the hooked "1" as default, while the regular weight is renamed "Medium". Monotype celebrated the release with a London exhibition on Gill's work, as they had previously done for the general release of Gill's serif design Joanna in 1958. One addition was italic swash caps, which had been considered by Gill but never released.

The family includes 43 fonts, including 33 text fonts in nine weights and three widths; six inline fonts in five weights and two widths (one condensed); two shadowed fonts in two weights and one width; one shadowed outline font, and one deco font. The basic set of Regular, Light and Bold weights is bundled with Windows 10 in the user-downloadable "Pan-European Supplemental Fonts" package.

=== Miscellaneous ===
Peter Wiegel digitized a modified variant of Gill Sans Bold Condensed, known as TGL 12096-1, which was used on road signs in former East Germany until 1990.

== Usage ==
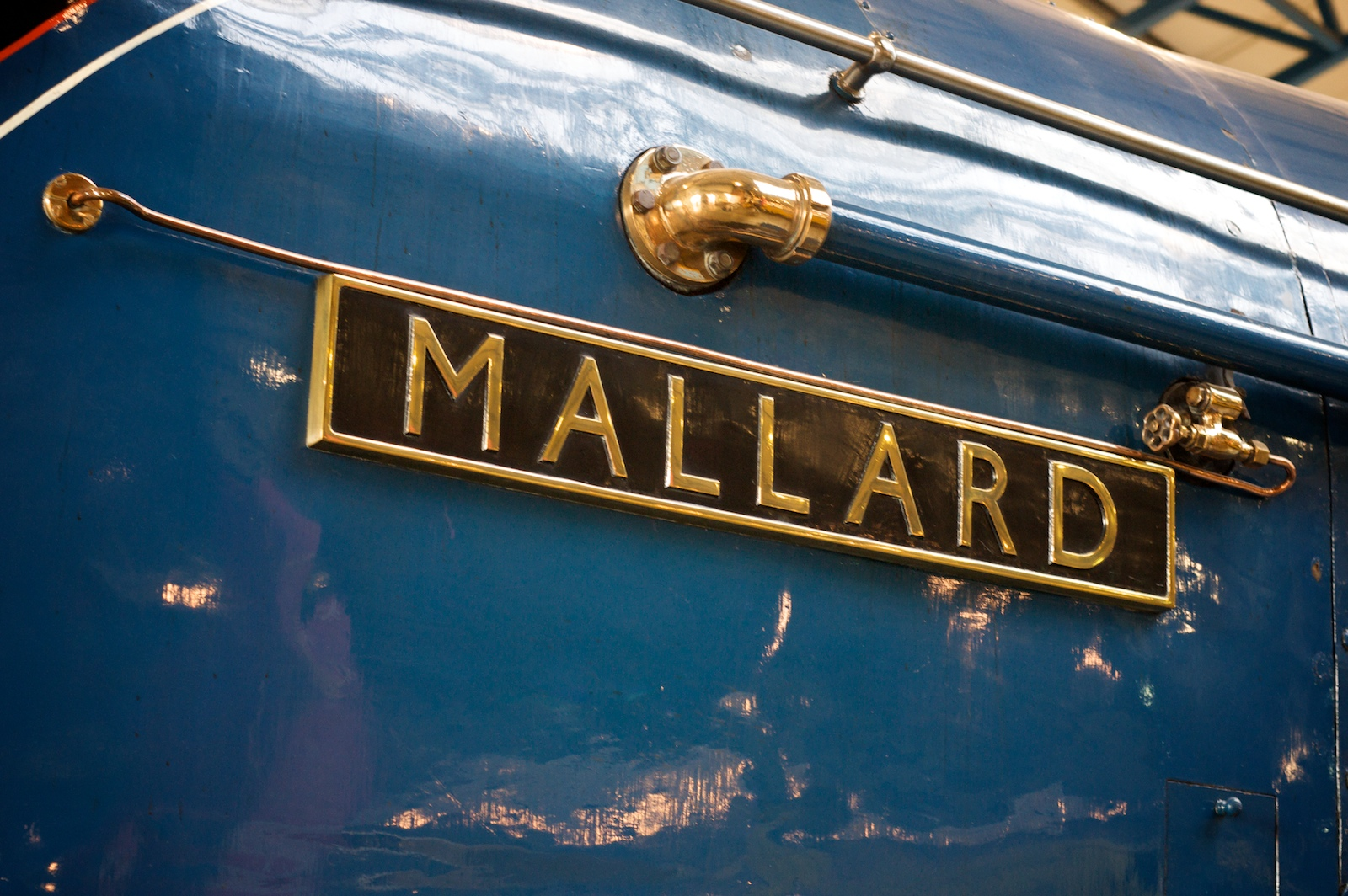
Gill Sans on the nameplate of the LNER locomotive Mallard

First unveiled in a single uppercase weight in 1928, Gill Sans achieved national prominence when it was chosen the following year to become the standard typeface of the LNER railway company, soon appearing on every facet of the company's identity, from metal locomotive nameplates and hand-painted station signage to printed restaurant car menus, timetables and advertising posters. The LNER promoted their rebranding by offering Gill (who was fascinated with railway engines) a footplate ride on the Flying Scotsman express service; Gill also painted a signboard for it in the style of Gill Sans, which survives in the collection of the St Bride Library.

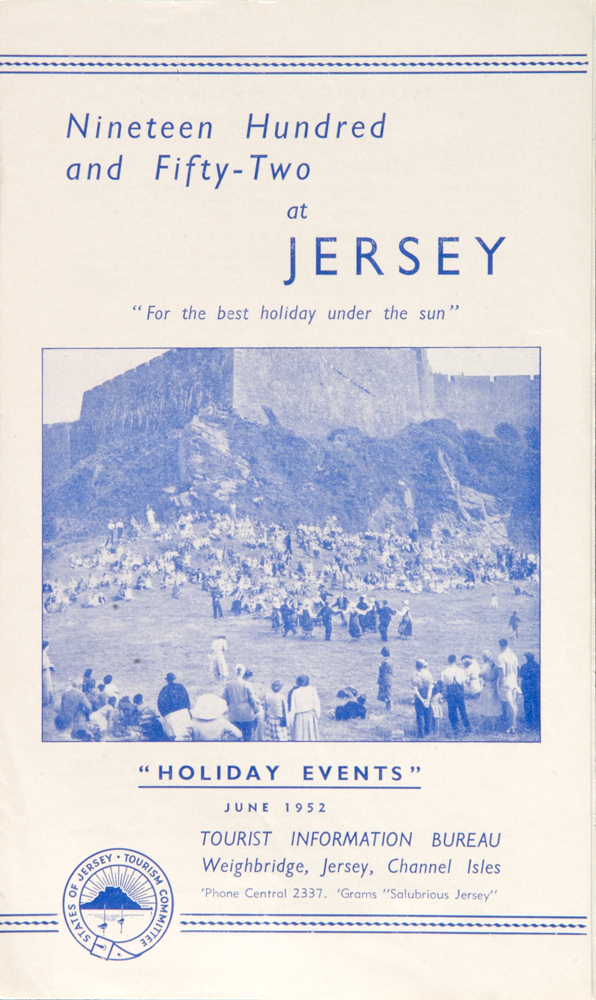
1952 Jersey holiday events brochure, typical of the design style of the period

In 1949, the Railway Executive decided on standard types of signs to be used at all stations. Lettering was to use the Gill Sans typeface on a background of the regional colour. Gill Sans was also used in much of its printed output, very often in capitals-only settings for signage. Specially drawn variations were developed by the Railway Executive (part of the British Transport Commission) for signs in its manual for the use of signpainters painting large signs by hand. Other users included Penguin Books' iconic paperback jacket designs from 1935, and British official mapping agency Ordnance Survey. It was also used by London Transport for documents that could not be practically set in Johnston. Printing historian Paul Shaw has described it as a key element of the "Modernist classical" style from the 1930s to the 1950s, which promoted clean, spare design, often with all-capitals and centred setting of headings.

Gill Sans remains popular, although a trend away from it took place around the 1950s and 1960s towards grotesque and neo-grotesque typefaces, under the influence of continental and American design. Typefaces that became popular around this time included original early "grotesque" sans-serifs, as well as new and more elegant designs in the same style, such as Helvetica and Univers. Mosley has commented that "orders unexpectedly revived" for the old Monotype Grotesque design in 1960: "[it] represents, even more evocatively than Univers, the fresh revolutionary breeze that began to blow through typography in the early sixties." In 2007, he added that "its rather clumsy design seems to have been one of the chief attractions to iconoclastic designers tired of the ... prettiness of Gill Sans". As an example of this trend, Jock Kinneir and Margaret Calvert's 1965 corporate rebranding of BR as British Rail introduced Helvetica and Univers for printed matter, and the custom but very similar Rail Alphabet for signage, and abandoned the classical, all caps signage style with which Gill Sans is often associated. Kinneir and Calvert's road signage redesign used a similar approach. Linotype and its designer Hermann Zapf, who had begun development on a planned competitor to Gill Sans in 1955, first considered redrawing some letters to make it more like these faces before abandoning the design project (now named "Magnus") around 1962–63.

An additional development which reduced Gill Sans' dominance was the arrival of phototypesetting, which allowed typefaces to be printed from photographs on film and (especially in display use; hot metal continued for some body text setting for longer) massively increased the range of typefaces that could cheaply be used. Dry transfers like Letraset had a similar effect for smaller projects; their sans-serif Compacta and Stephenson Blake's Impact exemplified the design trends of the period by choosing dense, industrial designs. Of the period from the 1930s to 1950s, when he was growing up, James Mosley would later write:

The Monotype classics dominated the typographical landscape ... in Britain, at any rate, they were so ubiquitous that, while their excellent quality was undeniable, it was possible to be bored by them and to begin to rebel against the bland good taste that they represented. In fact we were already aware by 1960 that they might not be around to bore us for too long. The death of metal type ... seemed at last to be happening. (Note: A major part of Mosley's career in the period, indeed, was accumulating for St Bride Library metal type equipment from companies disposing of it.)

While it was extremely popular in Britain, and to a lesser extent in European printing, Gill Sans did not achieve popularity with American printers in the hot metal era, with most preferring gothic typefaces like Franklin Gothic, as well as geometric designs like Futura and Monotype's own Twentieth Century. (Note: Monotype's competitor Linotype was dominant in the American market at the time, which may have been a factor in this. The shadow-effect capitals-only fonts appear in some US specimen brochures that otherwise excluded it in this period, in particular the Cameo Ruled weight, which was sold by Baltimore Type Founders in its Airport family, otherwise a clone of Futura.) Gill Sans thus particularly achieved worldwide popularity after the close of the metal type era and in the phototypesetting and digital era, when it became a system font on Macintosh computers and Microsoft Office. One use of Gill's work in the United States in this period, however, was a custom wordmark and logo made by Gill in 1930 for Poetry magazine, based on Gill Sans. Its editor Harriet Monroe had seen Gill's work in London.

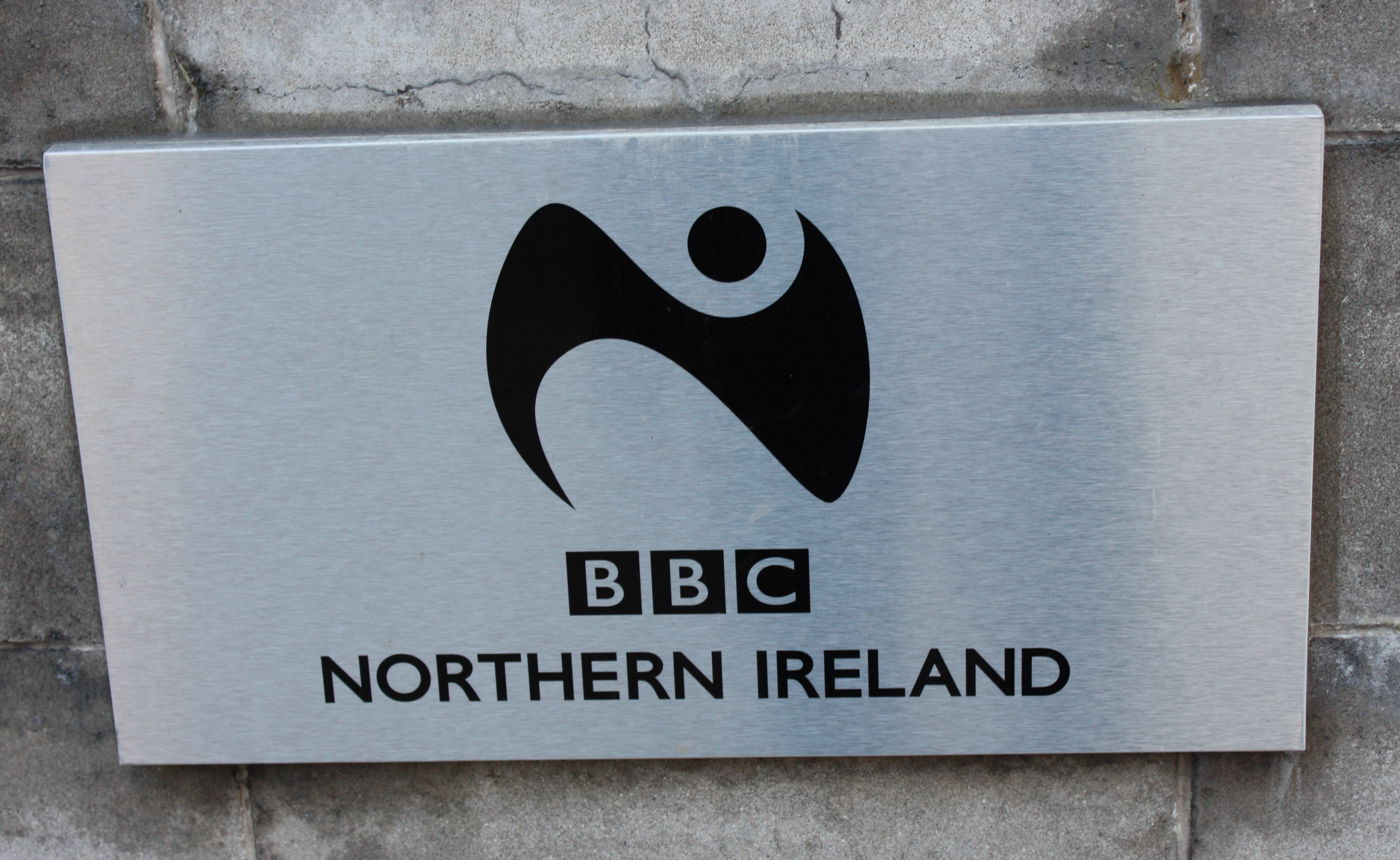
Signage at the BBC Broadcasting House, Belfast, using Gill Sans. The BBC logo shown here was used from 1997 until 2021.

In 1997, the BBC adopted the typeface as its corporate typeface for many but not all purposes, including on its logo. Explaining the change, designer Martin Lambie-Nairn said that "by choosing a typeface that has stood the test of time, we avoid the trap of going down a modish route that might look outdated in several years' time". This was not Gill's only association with the BBC, as he had designed sculptures and other artwork that are on display at the broadcaster's London headquarters, Broadcasting House. In 2017, the BBC began to phase out Gill Sans in favour of "Reith" (named after its first general manager John Reith), a proprietary corporate font family designed to be more legible on mobile devices, and did not require licensing for continued use. The font was adopted by the BBC's corporate logo in 2021.

The Wikimedia Commons logo uses the Gill Sans font for its wordmark.

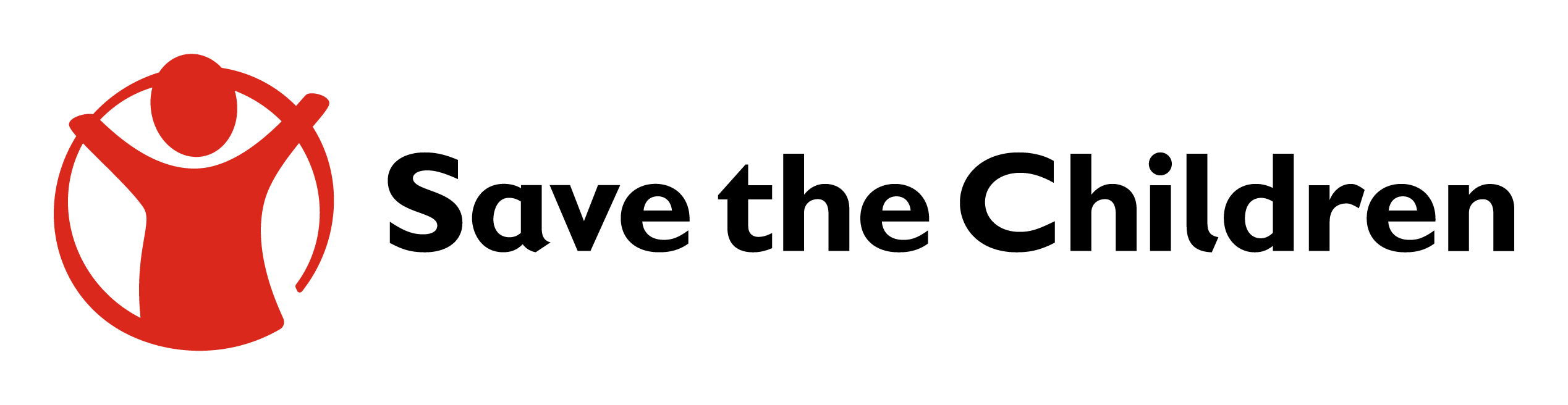
Save the Children's logo before the 2022 change

Until 2022, the charity Save the Children featured Gill Sans in its logo and branding. Following increased publicity of designer Eric Gill's sexual abuse of his children and others, the charity rebranded, saying that it was "moving away from using the Gill Sans font."

== Similar fonts ==
=== Early competitors ===
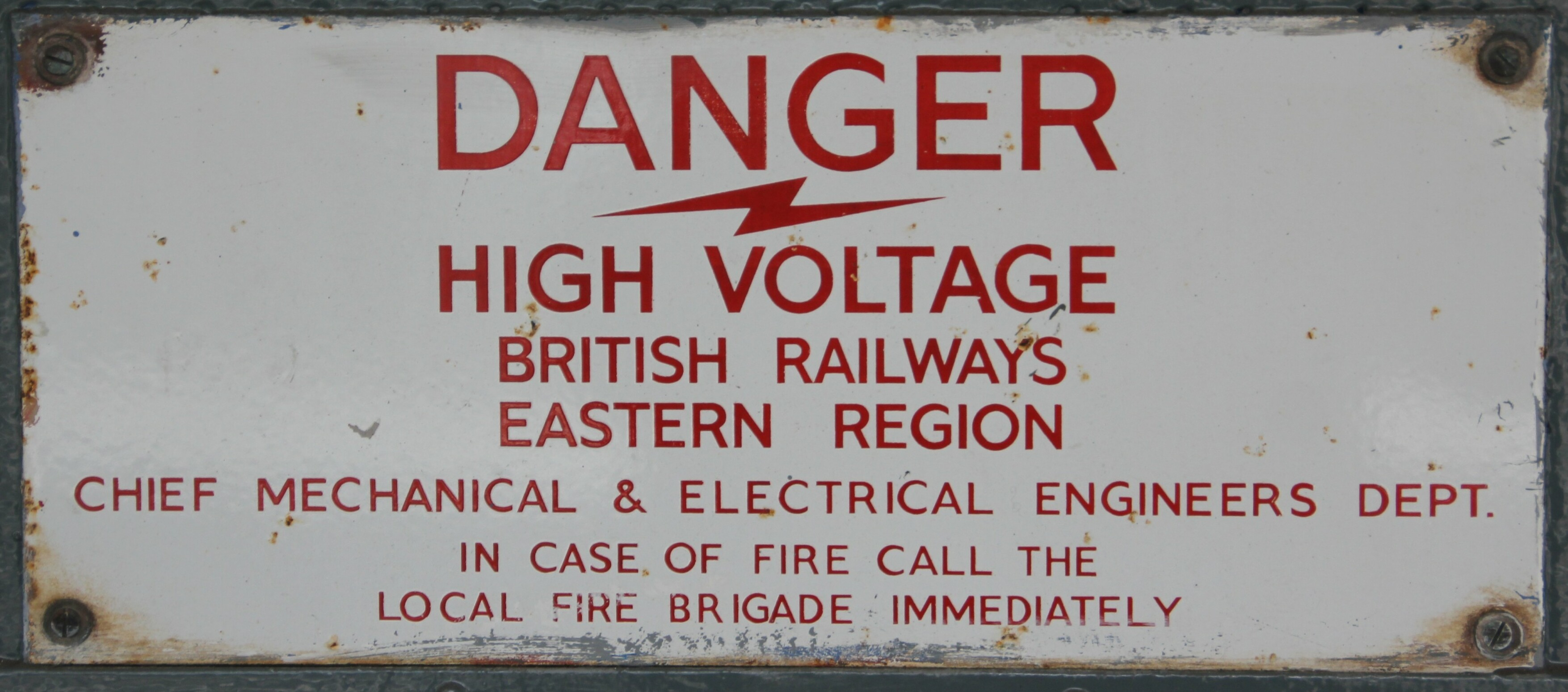
Lettering on an Eastern Region of British Railways sign. While the lettering is clearly based on Gill Sans, some letters such as the R are very different.

In 1930, the Sheffield type foundry Stephenson Blake released Granby, a commercial competitor influenced by Gill Sans, Johnston and Futura. It was a large family with condensed and inline styles, and a diamond-dot design like Johnston. It also included a "Granby Elephant" weight influenced by Gill Kayo.

Another similar but more eccentric design was created by Johnston's student Harold Curwen for the use of his family company, the Curwen Press of Plaistow. Named "Curwen Sans" or "Curwen Modern", it has many similarities to Johnston as well, and was occasionally used by London Transport in work printed by the Curwen Press. Curwen described it as based on his time studying with Johnston in the 1900s, although it was not cut into metal until 1928, around the same time as Gill Sans was released, with a lower-case similar to that of Kabel. A digitisation by K-Type was released in 2018.

Several intended Gill Sans competitors were developed during the period of its popularity, but ultimately did not see mass release. Jan Tschichold, who would later make extensive use of Gill Sans while designing books for Penguin, created a similar design for an early phototypesetting machine, which was at the time seldom used but also since digitised. During the 1930s, Dutch type designer Jan van Krimpen, also a friend of Morison's, designed Romulus, a superfamily with serif and humanist sans-serif companion: the sans-serif, with a low x-height, never progressed beyond test proofs. As mentioned above, Linotype began work in 1955 on a Gill Sans competitor, intended to be named "Magnus". (Note: The name "Britannia" was also considered, but was abandoned due to Stephenson Blake's pre-existing Britannic design.) Designed by German type designer Hermann Zapf with input from British Linotype manager Walter Tracy, the design was ultimately abandoned by 1963 due to lack of manufacturing capacity and changing tastes, although it too reached test proofs.

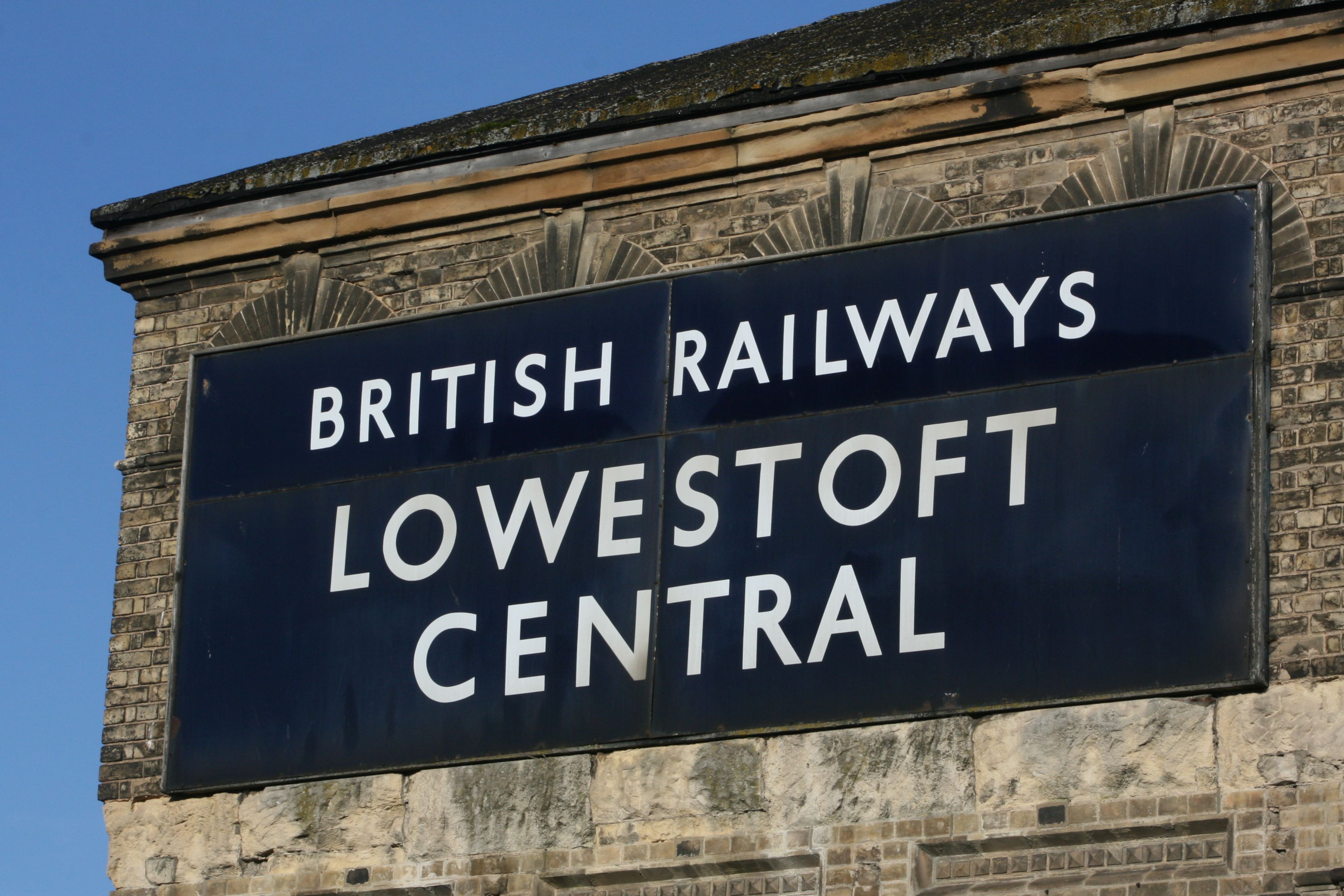
Enamel sign at Lowestoft Central station in British Railways standard lettering. The right-hand side of the legs of the "R"s are straight rather than Gill's smooth curve.

Besides similar fonts, many signs and objects made in Britain during the period of Gill Sans' dominance, such as the Keep Calm and Carry On poster, received hand-painted or custom lettering similar to Gill Sans. During the war, Fighter Command used a standard set of letters similar to it. Matthew Carter, later a prominent font designer, recalled in 2005 that his mother cut linoleum block letters based on it for him to play with. Another little-known follower was the NEN 3225 standard lettering, a project by the Dutch Standards Institute to create a set of standardised lettering for public use in the Netherlands, comprising a sans-serif similar to Gill Sans and a companion serif font drawn by Jan van Krimpen. The project was begun in 1944, but was not published until 1963, and ultimately did not become popular.

=== Later and digital-only designs ===
The category of humanist sans-serif typefaces, which Gill Sans helped to define, saw great attention during the 1980s and 1990s, especially as a reaction against the overwhelming popularity of Helvetica and Univers in the 1960s and 1970s.

Modern sans-serif designs inspired by Gill often adapt the concept by creating a design better proportioned and spaced for body text, a wider and more homogeneous range of weights, something easier since the arrival of the computer due to the use of multiple master or interpolated font design, or more irregular and hand-drawn in style. Jeremy Tankard's Bliss and Volker Küster's Today Sans are modern variations; Tankard commented on the genre's eclipse that his aim was to create "the first commercial typeface with an English feel since Gill Sans". Rowton Sans is inspired by Gill but has a nearly upright italic, similar to that used by Gill in his serif font Joanna. More distantly, Arthur Vanson's Chesham Sans is inspired by the British tradition of sans-serif signpainting, with many similarities to Gill's work. Bitstream's Humanist 521 was an unofficial digitisation, to which its Russian licensee ParaType added a Cyrillic version in 1997. SoftMaker and Fontsite also released Gill Sans digitisations under different names, including "Chantilly" and "Gibson".

More loosely, Syntax by Hans Eduard Meier is similar in some ways. Released in 1968 and praised by Tschichold, it was intended to be a more dynamic, handwriting-influenced sans-serif form. Its italic is, however, more of an oblique than Gill's. Hypatia Sans, designed by Thomas Phinney and released by Adobe, was intended to be a more characterful humanist sans design. Many other fonts are influenced by Gill Sans to some extent.

=== Font superfamilies ===
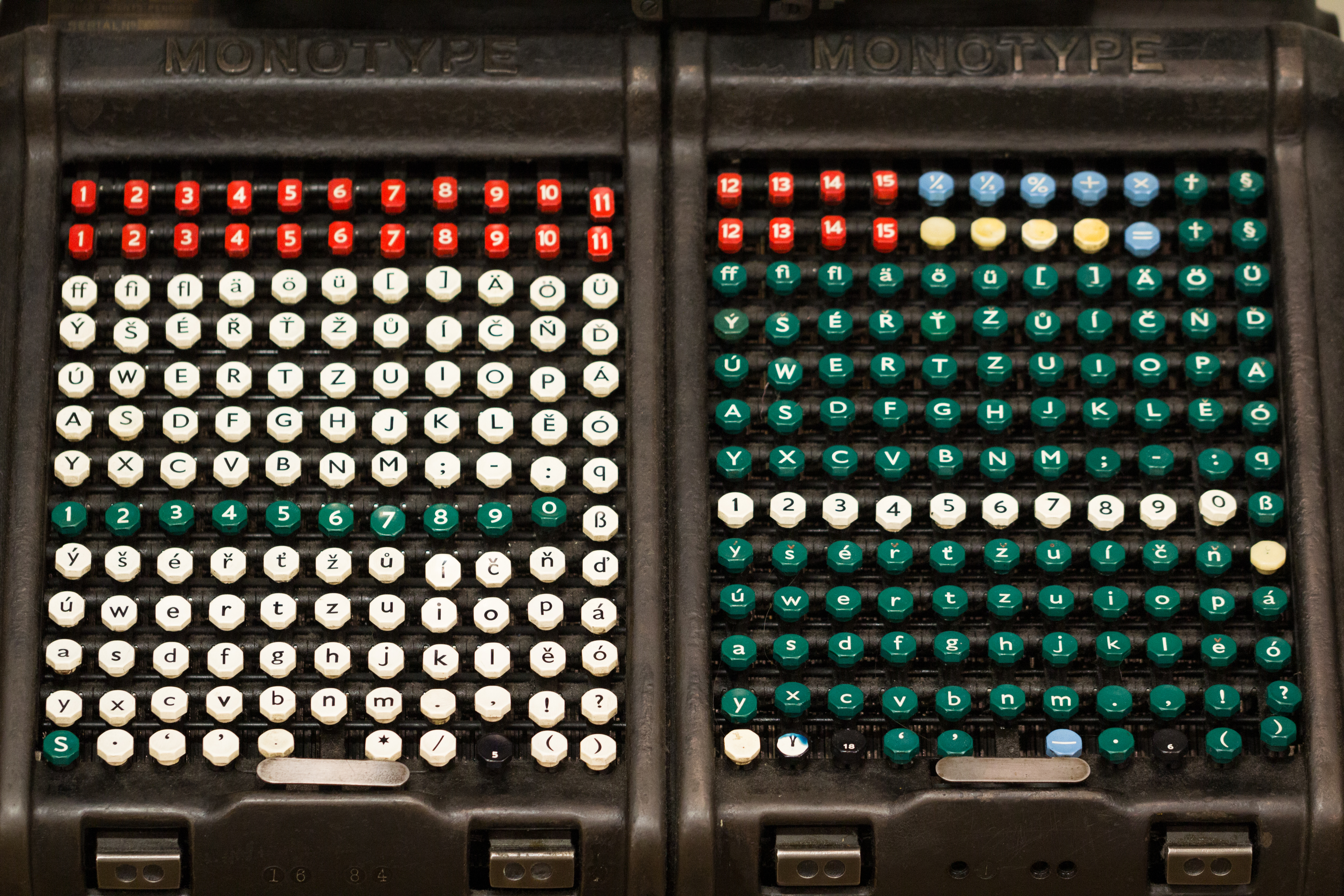
A lightly customised Gill Sans on a 1935 Monotype typesetter keyboard

A logical extension of the humanist sans-serif concept is the font superfamily: a serif font and a matching humanist sans-serif with similar letterforms. Martin Majoor's FF Scala Sans is a popular example of this influenced by Gill's work; others include Charlotte Sans and Serif by Michael Gills for Letraset, Mr and Mrs Eaves, by Zuzana Licko, are based on Baskerville, and Dover Sans and Serif, by Robin Mientjes, are based on Caslon. Monotype itself released Joanna Sans in 2015, as a screen-optimised sans-serif font intended to complement (but not exactly match) Gill's serif design Joanna.

=== Legal aspects ===
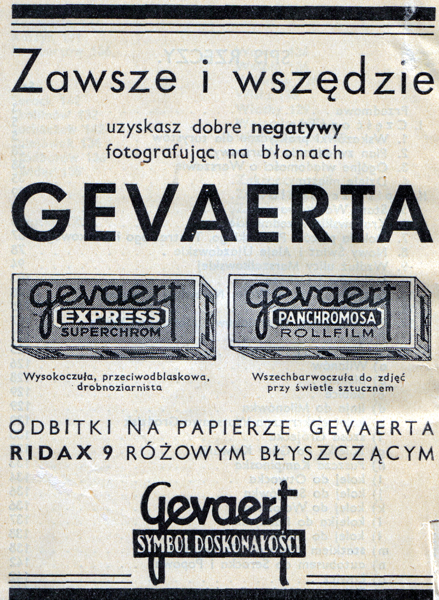
Portions of this inter-war Polish advertisement (of Gevaert negatives) are in Gill Sans using the "continental" alternatives resembling Futura

In many countries, typeface designs are not copyrightable, and in others, such as the United Kingdom, the design is out of copyright after the 70 years have passed since Gill's death in 1940, when the metal type family had been essentially completed. That makes it legally permissible to create alternative digitised versions of Gill Sans, although not necessarily of later Monotype additions to the font, such as the book weight and euro sign. However, the name "Gill Sans" remains a Monotype trademark (no. 1340167 in the US), and therefore is not eligible to be used to name any derivative font.

No complete direct open-source Gill Sans clone has been released. One of the most extensive is Gillius, a derivative by the Arkandis Digital Foundry project and designer Hirwen Harendal, which includes bold, italic, condensed and condensed bold styles. It is not a pure clone, but rather is partly created by modifying Bitstream Vera and adds influences from geometric fonts that are particularly visible in the design of the "w". K22, a foundry in Quezon City that is operated by designer "Toto G", has released two Gill Sans shadowed variants as K22 EricGill Shadow (digitising the Gill Sans Shadow 338 design) and K22 EricGill Shadow Line, an inline variant, for free for "personal, private and non-commercial purposes" and for sale for commercial use. Sans Guilt, a direct clone of the medium weight, was released by Brussels open source design group OSP in 2011, but contains several obvious errors, such as misaligned "w" and "x" characters.

== Bibliography ==
- Carter, Sebastian. Twentieth Century Type Designers. W.W. Norton, 1995. ISBN 0-393-70199-9.
- Johnson, Jaspert & Berry. Encyclopedia of Type Faces. Cassell & Co, 2001. ISBN 1-84188-139-2.
- Ott, Nicolaus, Friedl Fredrich, and Stein Bernard. Typography and Encyclopedic Survey of Type Design and Techniques Throughout History. Black Dog & Leventhal Publishers. 1998, ISBN 1-57912-023-7.
- Ovenden, Mark. Johnston and Gill: Very British Types. Lund Humphries. 2016, ISBN 978-1-84822-176-5
