= Kalkito =

Kalkito may refer to:

- "Kalkito", pseudonym of the electronic musician Paul Kalkbrenner
- Kalkitos, a subset of Action Transfers, which are a type of art-based children's pastime
