= Harold Lohner =

American printmaker and designer

Harold Lohner (born 1958 in Schenectady, New York) is an American printmaker and designer of freeware and shareware fonts.

Lohner has designed over 100 typefaces, and has licensed some of his shareware designs to the non-profit organization Autumn Leaves. He has also digitised some analog Letraset fonts such as Block-Up.

Lohner has designed many three-dimensional, geometric and decorative optical typefaces such as Good Vibes, Atlas Solid, Joggle, Fortuna Dot, Le Film Classic, Pop Stars, Onion and Red Circle. In an alternative vein, Captain Howdy, Mystic Prophet and Sideshow are a unique trio of typefaces based on type found on Ouija game boards.

The ideas and themes behind Lohner's work come from historical art and typography found in books, magazines, classic and nostalgic films titles, flea markets and online sources, which he interprets and puts his own unique stamp on. He has drawn several revivals of 20th century classics by Rudolf Koch, including Bride of the Monster (an interpretation of Koch's Neuland), Koch Dingbats, Koch Quadrat and Koch Rivoli.

Lohner has been a significant aspect of the cultural life of the New York State Capital Region since his artwork first appeared in The Artists of the Mohawk-Hudson Region exhibition in 1978. His works have been subsequently featured or included in over 80 exhibitions, receiving a dozen honors and awards. Lohner is a native of the region and earned BA, MA, and MFA degrees from the University at Albany. In 1982 he accepted a faculty position at Russell Sage College and was Gallery Director there from 1985-1997. In 2002, Lohner transferred to Sage College of Albany. He is a member of Phi Kappa Phi and was named Professor of the Year in 2006. He currently teaches printmaking, artists’ books, and the freshman Visualization course. He is Coordinator of the Fine Arts program and is the faculty advisor for the Little Gallery. Lohner is a rare individual who has made significant contributions as an artist, mentor, and gallerist.

All but one of Harold Lohner's free downloadable fonts are TrueType format. He also offers his fonts in four collections on CD. Each contains over 60 fonts for Mac and Windows in TrueType and PostScript Type 1 formats.
