= Presto Magix =

Presto Magix (pronounced Presto Magic) was a brand of Action Transfers activity sets popular during the 1970s and 1980s. The sets were published by the American Publishing Corporation of Watertown, Massachusetts. They were originally made by the Papermate Division of Gillette from 1975 to 1978.

In 1976, the production of Action Transfers was transferred to Letraset's Italian factory, Sodecor, where offset litho printing was used with transfers for the first time. The impetus for the move was a joint venture undertaken with Gillette to produce Action Transfers under the name Kalkitos. These were widely distributed around the world, with the brand name occasionally differing. They were known as Presto Magix in the USA where only a handful of the total subjects offered by the other brands were released.

== Use ==
Presto Magix were usually a comic book formatted set which was sold at stores like Kmart as well as supermarkets in England, Puerto Rico, Canada and the United States. It contained a sheet of rub-on dry transfer decals and a background, on which players could place the decals at any place or position on the background the user wished. The decal was applied to the background by scribbling on the paper over the decal with a pencil or similar object.

Larger, boxed sets were also available.

== Branding ==
Many popular television shows, movies and entertainers of the era were featured, such as Popeye, Zorro, Mighty Mouse, Lone Ranger, Buck Rogers, Flash Gordon, Jabberjaw, Yogi Bear, The Flintstones, Richie Rich, Dynomutt, Scooby-Doo, Laff-A-Lympics, Bugs Bunny, Sesame Street, Masters of the Universe, E.T. the Extra-Terrestrial, The Dukes of Hazzard, Star Wars, and G.I. Joe. DC and Marvel superheroes were also licensed for multiple sets each - Thor, Wonder Woman, Superman, Batman, Spider-Man, The Incredible Hulk and many others, as well as Michael Jackson were featured on Presto Magix sets. The WWE, then known as WWF, also licensed Presto Magix.

Broad topics that required no licenses were also covered in the 1970s.

Historical subjects included - Battle at Little Big Horn / Battle of Midway / Discovery of America / Indian Ambush

Animal-themed sets included - Animals of Africa / Farm Animals / Prehistoric Animals / The Undersea World

Outer space-themed sets included - Invasion of Mission Control / Moon Exploration / Space Docking

Fiction/fairy tale-themed included - Alice in Wonderland / Around the World in 80 Days / Little Bears / Little Red Riding Hood / Puss in Boots / Robin Hood

Sports subjects included - The Bases Are Loaded / Grand Prix Formula I / Olympics / Soccer

Hamburger restaurant chain Wimpy sold Presto Magix Star Wars sheets during the late 1970s. There was also an Ozark Airlines edition in the United States.

Kalkitos are still being developed by Singapore-based creative enterprise, Ideas Empire Pte.

As of 2024, the Presto Magix trademark with intent to use has been filed by New Frontier Marketing Associates, LLC in Millburn, New Jersey.
