= Eight O'Clock Coffee =

American coffee brand

- Product type: Coffee
- Current owner: Tata Consumer Products
- Country: USA
- Introduced: 1859; 167 years ago
- Markets: USA
- Previous owners: The Great Atlantic & Pacific Tea Company (1859–2003); Gryphon Investors (2003–2006)
- Tagline: For Those Who Put Coffee First
- Website: www.eightoclock.com

Eight O'Clock Coffee is an American brand of coffee products currently manufactured by the Eight O'Clock Coffee Company, of North Bergen, New Jersey, a subsidiary of Tata Consumer Products; its coffee production plant is in Landover, Maryland. It has owned Eight O'Clock Coffee since 2006.

Eight O'Clock Coffee was created by The Great Atlantic & Pacific Tea Company (later A&P) in 1859, in the latter company's founding year. Despite selling off the brand in 2003, A&P continued to sell Eight O'Clock Coffee in its family of stores until the supermarkets closed in late 2015. Eight O'Clock is also sold in other supermarkets across the country.

== History ==
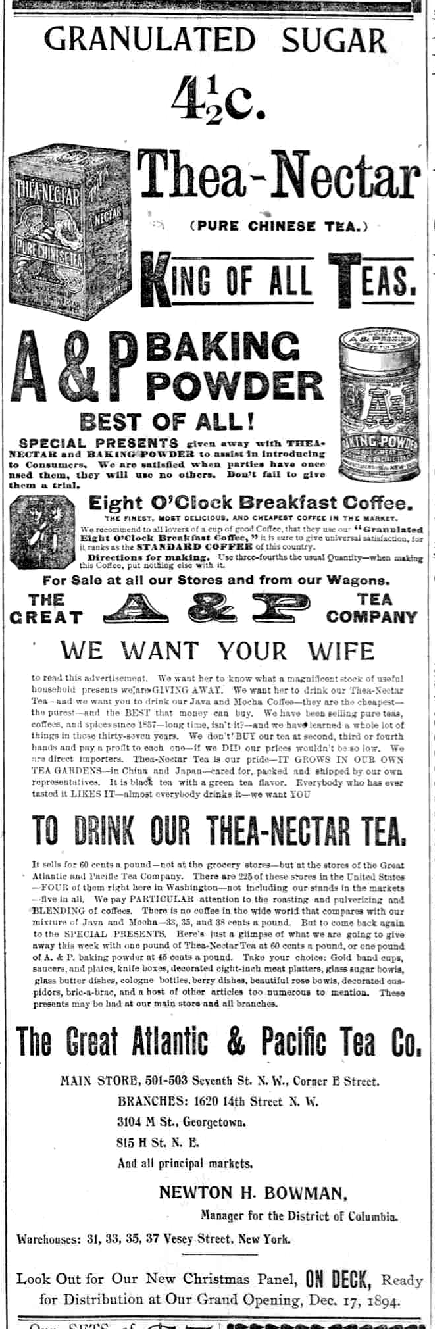
1894 newspaper ad for "Eight O'Clock Breakfast Blend" coffee from A&P

A&P was established as "Gilman & Company" in 1859, and began selling bags of whole bean coffee, in time informally referred to as "Eight O'Clock Breakfast Coffee".

In 1919 the coffee was finally given an official name, "8 O'Clock", alongside the two other brands in the A&P line, premium Bokar and mid-level Red Circle. A&P had supposedly conducted a survey asking people what time of day they drank coffee most, with the highest responses being 8 a.m. and 8 p.m.. A&P then smartly removed the word "Breakfast" from the informal name.

8 O’Clock coffee received a Gold Medal at the 1926 Sesquicentennial Exhibition in Philadelphia, distinguishing it from its competition. This resulted in A&P shifting its advertising emphasis to it, and the first major redesign in packaging. The 1927-1933 design changed the '8' to 'Eight' and prominently displayed a reproduction of the Sesquicentennial gold medal.

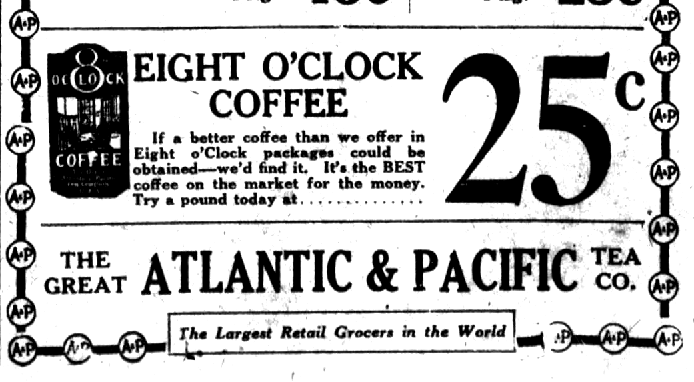
In 1922, the coffee cost 25¢ a pound

By 1930, Eight O'Clock was the most popular brand of coffee in the United States, with over a quarter of the nation's market share in that decade. In the autumn of 1933, packaging was redesigned again to reflect the then-popular Art Deco style. These changes introduced the distinctive font used on the packaging for nearly 70 years. To boost sales and reinforce the repackaging effort, similarly-styled coffee mills were installed in stores, a great convenience for customers.)

By the late 1950s, however, A&P began a decline it was never to recover from. The deaths of George L. and John A. Hartford, the last two surviving children of George H. Hartford who shepherded the chain to prominence, failed to yield a capable successor. The next two decades were marked by contraction, including closing stores and leaving some mass U.S. markets to more vigorous competition.

Seeking to expand its revenues in spite of the contraction of its bricks-and-mortar stores, in 1979 the company licensed its branding division, Compass Foods, Inc., to sell Eight O'Clock Coffee to other retailers, including competing supermarket chains.

Interested in the cash, A&P's investors spun off the Eight O'Clock Coffee brand in 2003 to Gryphon Investors, a private equity firm based in San Francisco, California, which then established the independent Eight O'Clock Coffee Company. After introducing its own line of coffee, the company was sold by Gryphon to Tata Global Beverages in 2006.

In 2009 Consumer Reports rated Eight O'Clock Coffee's 100 percent Colombian brew as the "best buy" for ground brews, not only beating well-known mass-market brands such as Folgers and Maxwell House but high-end industry bar-setting Starbucks.

On August 8, 2013, the entire Eight O'Clock Coffee line was revamped with new packaging and new flavors.

== Coffee products ==
Until 2003, Eight O'Clock Coffee only came in original whole bean. Packaged in an all-red bag, the coffee could be ground at A&P stores by consumers using convenient grinders. The packaging was changed in 2010 to white bags with color coding. In 2013 flavors were packaged in identical red bags, returning to Eight O'Clock's traditional pre-2003 look.
