= Red Circle Coffee =

Coffee brand sold by A&P

Red Circle Coffee was a branded line of coffee sold by the American supermarket chain A&P, the middle tier of the company's coffee trio. Introduced in September 1919, it was bracketed by the existing brands of Bokar above and 8 O'Clock Coffee below it. In 1979, A&P licensed its division Compass Foods Inc. to sell Red Circle Coffee to other retailers, including competing supermarket chains. Compass Foods was subsequently spun-out from A&P and sold to a Private Equity buyer (Gryphon) in the 2000s then relatively quickly to its present owner, the Tata Group.

In 2022, it relaunched as Stockyards Coffee.
