= Dry transfer =

Type of decal

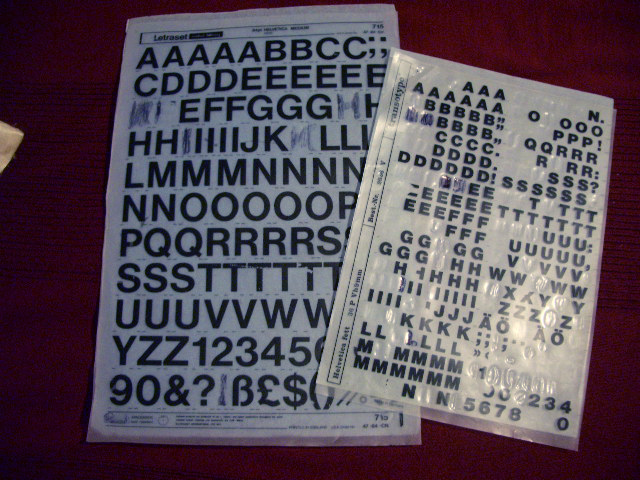
The dry transfer technique was used in lettering sheets made by Letraset (left) and other companies (right).

Dry transfers (also called rub-ons or rubdowns) are decals that can be applied without the use of water or other solvent. The decal itself is on a backing material such as paper or plastic sheeting much like a transparency. The dry transfer is placed in the desired location with the backing side up. The decal is then applied by burnishing the backing with a stylus or similar object such as a ballpoint pen. The contact side of the decal includes a pressure-sensitive adhesive; the combination of heat and pressure causes the decal to stick more strongly to the new surface than to the backing. When the backing is removed, the decal remains. This allows for ink only where needed even if the pattern is delicate, because the backing supports the decal while it is being applied.

Dry transfers are used in manual technical drawing when standard graphic elements such as title blocks, forms, patterned lines, shading, piping or electronic schematic symbols need to be repetitively used. Use of a dry transfer reduces drawing time and standardizes appearance. Dry transfer lettering such as Letraset brand is used where hand-drawn lettering is laborious to apply. From the 1960s to the 1980s, dry transfers featuring action scenes were a popular children's pastime.

== See also ==
- Appliqué
- Presto Magix
