= Action Transfers =

Dry-transfer decal sets for children

Action Transfers, also known as rub-on transfers, were an art-based children's pastime that was extremely popular throughout the world from the 1960s to the 1980s. They consisted of a printed cardboard background image and a transparent sheet of coloured dry transfer figures of people, animals, vehicles, weapons, explosions and so on. These transfers were supposed to be applied to the background scene by rubbing the top surface of the transparent sheet with a hard object or stylus; typically, this would mean a ball-point pen or a pencil; the figure would thereby be transferred from its sheet to the background. Since it was not customary to determine exactly where the transfers should be applied, surreal or comic effects could be achieved—whether deliberately or inadvertently—by juxtaposing the transfers and the background inappropriately. It was also possible to apply the transfer figures elsewhere than on the supplied background, and conversely it is quite common to come across finished transfer sets in which the descriptive lettering from the sheets has been applied to the background, an effect not intended by the manufacturer.

A number of different sets were distributed by a wide variety of companies between the late 1960s and the 1980s; these included sets based on popular comics and cartoons (e.g., DC Comics, Marvel Comics, Hanna Barbera, and Disney cartoons), television series and movies (e.g., Star Wars and Battlestar Galactica), as well as original content sets. Since Letraset had a patent monopoly on the dry rub-down transfer process, until the end of the 1970s any transfers supplied with these sets would have been printed by Letraset, firstly at Waterloo Road in London, then later at Ashford in Kent, and finally at their factory in Italy.

== History ==
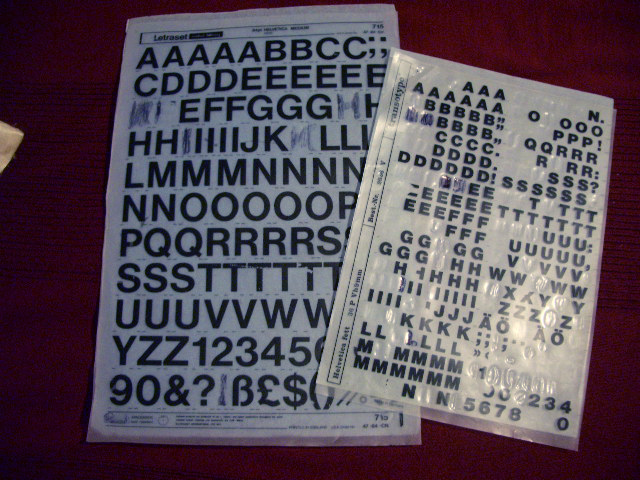
Partially used typographic character sheets made by Letraset (left) and similar product made by a rival (right).

Letraset, the company that developed the Instant Lettering transfer sheets that dominated design and publishing before the advent of desktop publishing, created the first dry rub-down transfer sets for children and marketed them as "Instant Pictures" in 1964. They were originally silk screen printed and monochromatic, but by 1966 they were being produced using four spot colours.

Most of the Instant Pictures after 1965 were produced for either John Waddington Ltd. or Patterson Blick.

Letraset purchased a rotary gravure press which they installed at Ashford in Kent, and there they produced true full-colour transfers for the first time starting in 1967. These were not strictly CMYK colour transfers, because white ink is also required—since transfers are printed on transparent plastic, and not on white paper.

In 1969 the first Action Transfer sets were produced in this way, initially with a range of twelve sets—although the range rapidly expanded. Letraset stopped using the title "Instant Pictures" and from then on referred to their own transfers as "Action Transfers", even if they were not actually in the range of sets originally given that name.

In 1976, the production of Action Transfers was transferred to Letraset's Italian factory, Sodecor, where offset litho printing was used with transfers for the first time. The impetus for the move was a joint venture undertaken with Gillette to produce Action Transfers under the name Kalkitos. These were widely distributed around the world, with the brand name occasionally differing; in the US, they were known as Presto Magix.

After the acquisition of Letraset by Esselte in 1981, the production of transfers was continued by a British company named Acorn Printed Products, that was formed by several ex-Letraset staff members. Acorn still produce transfers to this day.
