= Bokar Coffee =

Coffee brand

- Current owner: American Modern Coffee LLC (2018–present)
- Country: United States
- Introduced: 1919
- Markets: Worldwide
- Previous owners: The Great Atlantic & Pacific Tea Company (1919–2003); Eight O'Clock Coffee Company (2003–2012)
- Website: https://verdugocoffee.com/product/bokar/

Bokar Coffee is a dark roasted brand of coffee originally owned by the American supermarket chain A&P and sold in A&P stores beginning in 1919.

Bokar blend is described as: "A select blend of 100% Arabica coffee beans, named for two famous coffee-producing areas in Colombia: Bogotá and Cartagena. When ground extra fine, makes a spectacular espresso."

In 1979, A&P licensed its brands division, Compass Foods, Inc., to sell Eight O'Clock, Bokar and Red Circle coffee to other retailers including competing supermarket chains. The brand Bokar and its sister brands Eight O'Clock and Red Circle coffee were sold-off by A&P in 2003.

In 2005 Tata Global Beverages took over ownership of Eight O'Clock Coffee Company as well as the Bokar coffee brand. Tata discontinued the brand outside of Canada in 2012. In 2018, Los Angeles, California-based American Modern Coffee acquired the Bokar brand and reintroduced the original coffee blend back into the American marketplace. American Modern Coffee now does business as Verdugo Coffee Roasters.
