= Letraset =

Type foundry company originating in the UK

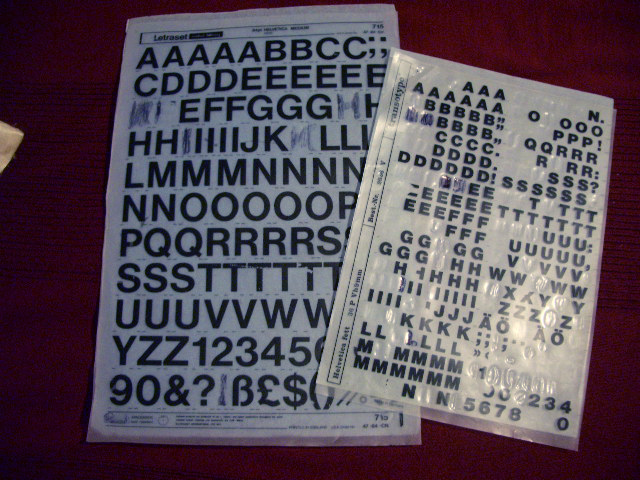
Dry-transfer lettering sheet made by Letraset (left) alongside similar product made by a rival

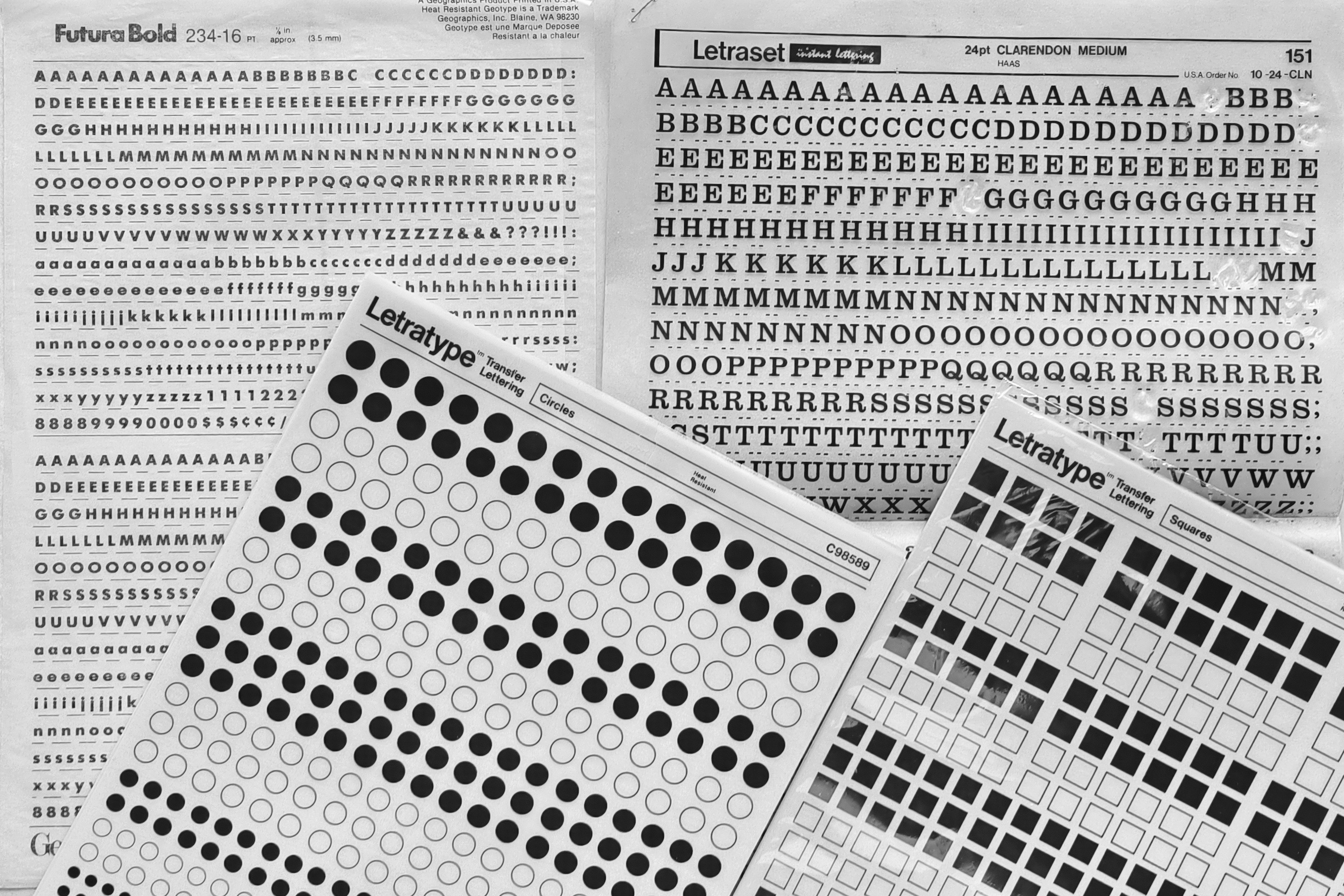
Dry-transfer lettering sheets. Top left: Futura Bold (no. 234-16) by Geotype. Top right: Clarendon Medium (no. 151) by Letraset. Bottom left: Circles (no. C98589) by Letraset. Bottom right: Squares (no. C87060) by Letraset.

Letraset was a manufacturer of dry transfer decal sheets of type and other artwork elements. Letraset was acquired by the Colart group and became part of its subsidiary Winsor & Newton.

== Corporate history ==
Letraset was founded in London, England, in 1959, with the launch of the Letraset Type Lettering System. In 1961, Letraset came out with their dry transfer lettering system, which pioneered the technique.

Starting in 1964, Letraset also applied the dry rub-down transfer technique to create a children's arts and crafts toy called Action Transfers, which would later develop into Kalkitos (marketed by Gillette), and many other series of transferable figures that were very popular up to the 1980s. Letraset was acquired by the Swedish stationery company Esselte until 2000, when it was sold to a management buyout headed up by Martin Gibbs and Michael Travers. Eventually sold to ColArt in 2012.

Seeing a decline in the sales of its materials in the early 1990s, Letraset moved into the desktop publishing industry, releasing software packages such as ImageStudio and ColorStudio for the Macintosh. These never saw widespread success. However, as Letraset held the rights to their fonts that had been popular on the dry transfer sheets, it made sense to enter the digital font market (see, for example, Charlotte Sans). Letraset thus began releasing many fonts in formats such as PostScript.

Fonts from designers including Martin Wait, Tim Donaldson, and David Quay were released, and many can be found on online retailers such as FontShop. Some fonts retain "Letraset" in their title, whereas others have been renamed by their new vendors, among them ITC.

A selection of fonts is still sold from its website, separated into fonts from Fontek and Red Rooster. Software includes Manga Studio EX and Envelopes, a plug-in for Adobe Illustrator.

Letraset is the maker of the refillable Tria markers, formerly Pantone Tria markers, which have a three-nib design and 200 colours. Additionally, Letraset offers three lines of dual-tipped markers, the alcohol-based ProMarker and FlexMarker lines, each with 148 mostly different colours and the water-based AquaMarkers with 60 colours.

Letraset was based in Le Mans, France, having previously been based in Ashford, Kent, until being acquired in June 2012 by the Colart group and becoming part of its subsidiary Winsor & Newton.

== Cultural history ==
The dry rub-down transfer technique was used by the punk movement because of its ease of manipulation, its low price and the quality of the rendered layout. Letraset's ease of use and widespread availability aligned with the do-it-yourself value of this movement by allowing punks to create designs independent from printers and publishers.

From the late 1960's until early 1990's the UK Land Registry used Letraset to create the lettering on each original house land plan produced from a survey in combination with pen and ink line drawing. This came to an end with the advent of computerisation.

== Product ==
In common usage, the name Letraset originally referred to sheets of transfer lettering that were originally manufactured as a wet process in 1959, with each character selected and cut from a sheet, placed face-down on a small silk screen frame and wetted with a paint brush to soften and release the gum arabic adhesive which held it. The frame was then turned over and the letter located over the artwork, and the character pressed into contact with the page, with the mounting base slid away as with model aircraft transfers.

Later, in 1961, the process was simplified, and a dry transferable lettering system was developed. The range of available typefaces expanded, incorporating both classic and contemporary type designs of the period. Letraset sheets were used extensively by professional and amateur graphic designers, architects and artists in the 1960s, 1970s, and 1980s. As a result of its relative affordability, and because of its ease of use, it also came to be used by printers, design studios and advertising agencies. In the late 1980s, Letraset started to be replaced by desktop publishing. Today, Letraset sheets are traded on eBay and elsewhere, and sometimes used so that a designer can avoid a digital look.

The name Letraset is also often used to refer generically to sheets of dry-transfer lettering of any brand. This technique was very widespread for lettering and other elements before the advent of the phototypesetting and laser computer techniques of word processing and desktop publishing. Currently, Letraset's line of print patterns and textures are more commonly used than its lettering.

The original artwork for the majority of the Letraset typeface designs survives as rubylith master patterns at St Bride Printing Library, Bride Lane, London.

== Lorem ipsum ==
Lorem ipsum filler text has been featured on Letraset advertisements for decades. There are some indications that its use predates Letraset, but nothing definite has surfaced prior to Letraset's popularising it.

== See also ==
- Dry transfer
- Screentone
