= An Essay on Typography =

Book by Eric Gill

An Essay on Typography, etc.
- Author: Eric Gill
- Language: English
- Published: 1931 (Sheed & Ward)
- Publication place: United Kingdom
- Pages: 120

An Essay on Typography is a 1931 book by Eric Gill about the history of typographical art and production. It has been considered a classic since its first publication. The influential graphic designer Paul Rand called it 'timeless and absorbing' in a review for The New York Times.

The first edition of the book was typeset by Gill himself in his own Joanna typeface, which made use of typographical features similar to those seen on handwritten manuscripts.
