= Eric Gill =

English artist (1882–1940)

Eric Gill ARA RDI
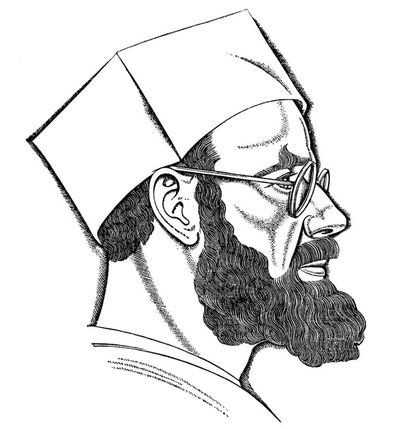
- Self-portrait, c. 1927
- Born: Arthur Eric Rowton Gill; 22 February 1882; Brighton, Sussex, England
- Died: 17 November 1940 (aged 58); Middlesex, England
- Education: Chichester Technical and Art School; Westminster Technical Institute; Central School of Arts and Crafts
- Known for: Sculpture, typography
- Movement: Arts and Crafts movement
- Spouse: Ethel Hester Moore (m. 1904)
- Children: 4
- Relatives: MacDonald "Max" Gill (brother); David Gill (nephew)

Arthur Eric Rowton Gill (22 February 1882 – 17 November 1940) was an English sculptor, letter cutter, typeface designer, and printmaker. Although the Oxford Dictionary of National Biography describes Gill as "the greatest artist-craftsman of the twentieth century: a letter-cutter and type designer of genius", he is also a figure of considerable controversy following the revelations of his sexual abuse of two of his daughters and of his pet dog.

Gill was born in Brighton and grew up in Chichester, where he attended the local college before moving to London. There he became an apprentice with a firm of ecclesiastical architects and took evening classes in stone masonry and calligraphy. Gill abandoned his architectural training and set up a business cutting memorial inscriptions for buildings and headstones. He also began designing chapter headings and title pages for books.

As a young man, Gill was a member of the Fabian Society, but later resigned. Initially identifying with the Arts and Crafts Movement, by 1907 he was lecturing and campaigning against the movement's perceived failings. He became a Roman Catholic in 1913 and remained so for the rest of his life. Gill established a succession of craft communities, each with a chapel at its centre and with an emphasis on manual labour as opposed to more modern industrial methods. The first of these communities was at Ditchling in Sussex, where Gill established The Guild of St Joseph and St Dominic for Catholic craftsmen. Many members of the Guild, including Gill, were also members of the Third Order of Saint Dominic, a lay division of the Dominican Order. At Ditchling, Gill and his assistants created several war memorials including those at Chirk in north Wales and at Trumpington near Cambridge, along with numerous works on religious subjects.

In 1924, the Gill family left Ditchling and moved to an isolated, disused monastery at Capel-y-ffin in the Black Mountains of Wales. The isolation of Capel-y-ffin suited Gill's wish to distance himself from what he regarded as an increasingly secular and industrialised society, and his time there proved to be among the most productive of his artistic career. At Capel, Gill made the sculptures The Sleeping Christ (1925), Deposition (1925), and Mankind (1927). He created engravings for a series of books published by the Golden Cockerel Press considered among the finest of their kind, and it was at Capel that he designed the typefaces Perpetua, Gill Sans, and Solus. After four years at Capel, Gill and his family moved into a quadrangle of properties at Speen in Buckinghamshire. From there, in the last decade of his life, Gill became an architectural sculptor of some fame, creating large, high-profile works for central London buildings, including both the headquarters of the BBC and the forerunner of London Underground. His mammoth frieze The Creation of Man was the British Government's gift to the new League of Nations building in Geneva. Despite failing health Gill was active as a sculptor until the last weeks of his life, leaving several works to be completed by his assistants after his death.

Gill was a prolific writer on religious and social matters, with some 300 printed works including books and pamphlets to his name. He frequently courted controversy with his opposition to industrialisation, modern commerce, and the use of machinery in both the home and the workplace. In the years preceding World War II, he embraced pacifism and left-wing causes.

== Biography ==
=== Early life ===
Eric Gill was born in 1882 in Hamilton Road, Brighton, the second of the 13 children of the Reverend Arthur Tidman Gill and (Cicely) Rose King (died 1929), formerly a professional singer of light opera under the name Rose le Roi. Arthur Tidman Gill had left the Congregational Church in 1878 over doctrinal disagreements and became a minister of the Countess of Huntingdon's Connexion, a grouping of Calvinist Methodists. Arthur was born in the South Seas, where his father, George Gill, was a Congregational minister and missionary. Eric Gill was the elder brother of the graphic artist MacDonald "Max" Gill (1884–1947). Two of his other brothers, Romney and Cecil, became Anglican missionaries while their sister, Madeline, became a nun and also undertook missionary work. The film historian David Gill was a nephew.

In 1897, the family moved to Chichester, when Arthur Tidman Gill left the Countess of Huntingdon's Connexion, became a mature student at Chichester Theological College and joined the Church of England. Eric Gill studied at Chichester Technical and Art School, where he won a Queen's Prize for perspective drawing and developed a passion for lettering. Later in his life, Gill cited the Norman and medieval carved stone panels in Chichester Cathedral as a major influence on his sculpture. In 1900, Gill became disillusioned with Chichester and moved to London to train as an architect with the practice of W. D. Caröe, specialists in ecclesiastical architecture with a large office close to Westminster Abbey.

=== London 1900–1907 ===
Frustrated with his architectural training, Gill took evening classes in stonemasonry at the Westminster Technical Institute and, from 1901, in calligraphy at the Central School of Arts and Crafts while continuing to work at Caröe's. The calligraphy course was run by Edward Johnston, creator of the London Underground typeface, who became a strong and lasting influence on Gill. For a year, until 1903, Gill and Johnston shared lodgings at Lincoln's Inn in central London.

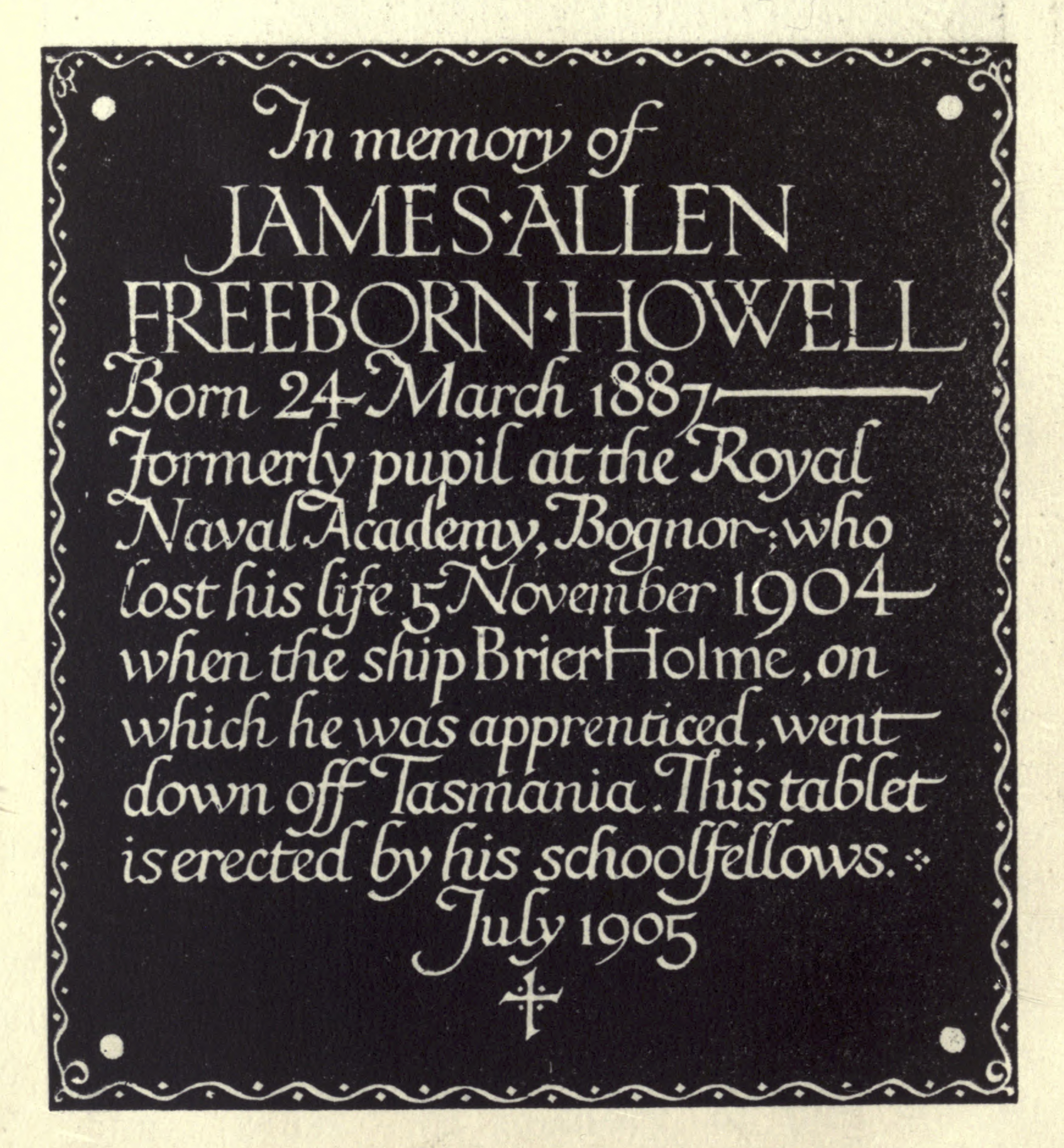
Rubbing of a memorial bronze created by Eric and Max Gill in 1905

During 1903, Gill gave up training in architecture to become a calligrapher, letter-cutter and monumental mason. After making a copy of a small stone tablet from Westminster Abbey, Gill's first public inscription was for a stone memorial tablet, to a Percy Joseph Hiscock, in Chichester Cathedral. Through a contact at the Central School, Gill was employed to cut the inscription for a tombstone at Brookwood Cemetery in Surrey. Other work quickly followed, including an inscription for Holy Trinity, Sloane Street, plus commissions from architects and private individuals, including Count Kessler. Kessler, on Johnston's recommendation, employed Gill to design chapter headings and title pages for the Insel Verlag publishing house. W. H. Smith & Son employed Gill to paint the lettering on the fascias of several of their bookshops including, in 1903, their Paris store. For a time, Gill combined this work with his job at Caröe's but eventually the scale and frequency of these commissions required him to leave the company. After Gill died, his brother, Evan, compiled an inventory of 762 inscriptions known to have been carved by him.

In 1904 Gill married Ethel Hester Moore (1878–1961), a former art student, later known as Mary, the daughter of a businessman who was also the head verger at Chichester Cathedral. Gill and Moore would eventually have three daughters and foster a son. After a short period in Battersea the couple moved into 20 Black Lion Lane, Hammersmith in west London, near the recently married Johnstons' home on Hammersmith Terrace. Artists associated with the Arts and Crafts movement, including Emery Walker, T. J. Cobden-Sanderson and May Morris, were already based in the area, as were several printers, including the Doves Press. Gill formed a business partnership with Lawrence Christie and recruited staff, including the 14-year-old Joseph Cribb, to work in his studio. Gill began giving lectures at the Central School and taught courses in monumental masonry and lettering for stonemasons at the Paddington Institute. In 1905 he was elected to the Arts and Crafts Exhibition Society and joined the Fabian Society the following year. After a period of intense involvement with the Fabians Gill became disillusioned with both them and the Arts and Crafts movement. By 1907 he was writing and making speeches about the failures, both theoretical and practical, of the craft movement to resist the advance of mass production.

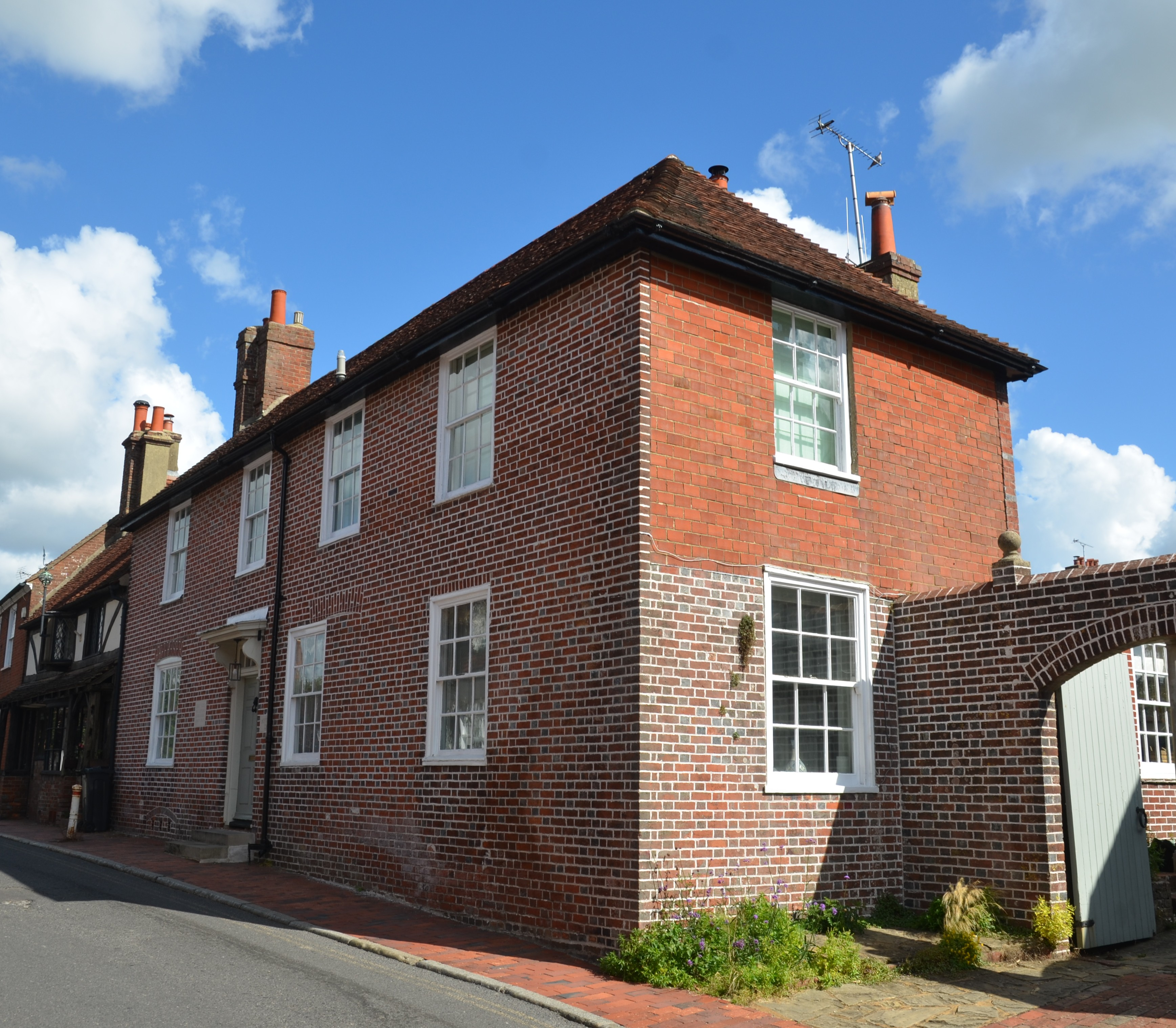
Sopers, Gill's home in Ditchling

In his diaries Gill records two affairs while living at Hammersmith. He had a brief affair with the family's maid while his wife was pregnant, and then a relationship with Lillian Meacham, whom he had met through the Fabian Society. Gill and Meacham visited the Paris Opera and Chartres Cathedral together and when their affair ended she became an apprentice in Gill's workshop and remained a family friend throughout his life.

=== Ditchling Village 1907–1913 ===
In 1907 Gill moved with his family to Sopers, a house in the village of Ditchling in Sussex, which would later become the centre of an artists' community inspired by Gill. Although by April 1908 Gill had established a workshop in Ditchling and dissolved his business partnership with Lawrence Christie, he continued to spend time in London visiting clients and delivering lectures while his wife, Ethel, organised their household and smallholding in Sussex. In London Gill would stay at his old lodgings in Lincoln's Inn with his brother Max or with his sister Gladys and Ernest Laughton, her future husband. Gill continued to concentrate on lettering and inscriptions for stonework and employed a pupil for his signwriting business. He also began to use wood-engraving techniques for his book illustration work, including a 1907 edition of Homer for Count Kessler.

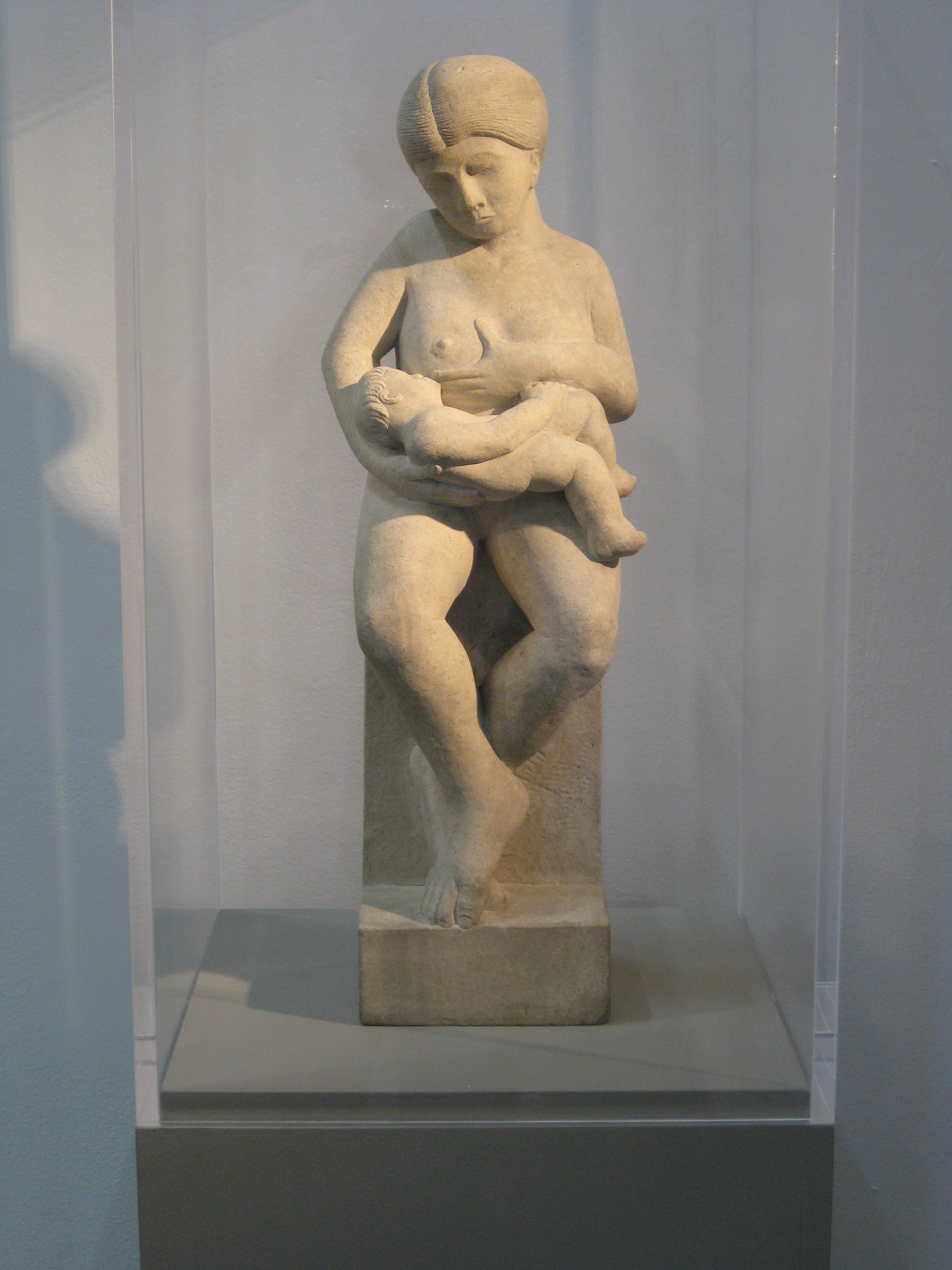
Mother and Child, 1910

Late in 1909 Gill decided to become a sculptor. Gill had always considered himself an artisan craftsman rather than an artist. He rejected the usual sculpture technique of first making a model and then scaling up using a pointing machine in favour of directly carving the final figure. His first sculptures included Madonna and Child (1910), which the art critic Roger Fry described as a depiction of "pathetic animalism", and the almost life-size work now known as Ecstasy (1911). The models for Ecstasy were his sister Gladys Gill and her husband, Ernest Laughton. The incestuous relationships between Gill and Gladys that continued during their lives had already begun at this point. There is also some evidence, from Gill's own writings, of an incestuous relationship with Angela, another of his sisters.

An early admirer of Gill's sculptures was William Rothenstein and he introduced Gill, who was fascinated by Indian temple sculptures, to the Ceylonese philosopher and art historian Ananda Coomaraswamy. Along with his friend and collaborator Jacob Epstein, Gill planned the construction in the Sussex countryside of a colossal, hand-carved monument in imitation of the large-scale structures at Gwalior Fort in Madhya Pradesh. Throughout the second half of 1910 Epstein and Gill would meet on an almost daily basis, but eventually their friendship soured very badly. Earlier in the year they had held long discussions with Rothenstein and other artists, including Augustus John and Ambrose McEvoy, about the formation of a religious brotherhood. At Ditchling Epstein worked on elements of Oscar Wilde's tomb in Père Lachaise cemetery, for which Gill designed the inscription before sending Joseph Cribb, who had moved to Ditchling in 1907, to Paris to carve the lettering.

Gill had his first sculpture exhibition in 1911 at the Chenil Gallery in London. Eight works by Gill were included in the Second Post-Impressionism Exhibition organised by Roger Fry at the Grafton Galleries in London during 1912 and 1913.

By 1912, while Gill's main source of income was from gravestone inscriptions, he had also carved Madonna figures and was widely assumed, wrongly at that time, to be a Catholic artist. As such he was invited to an exhibition of Catholic art in Brussels and en route stayed for some days at the Benedictine monastery at Mont-César Abbey near Louvain. Gill's experiences at Louvain, seeing the monks at prayer and hearing plainsong for the first time, persuaded him to become a Catholic. In February 1913, after religious instruction from English Benedictines, Gill and Ethel were received into the Roman Catholic Church and Ethel changed her name to Mary.

=== Westminster Cathedral 1914–1918 ===
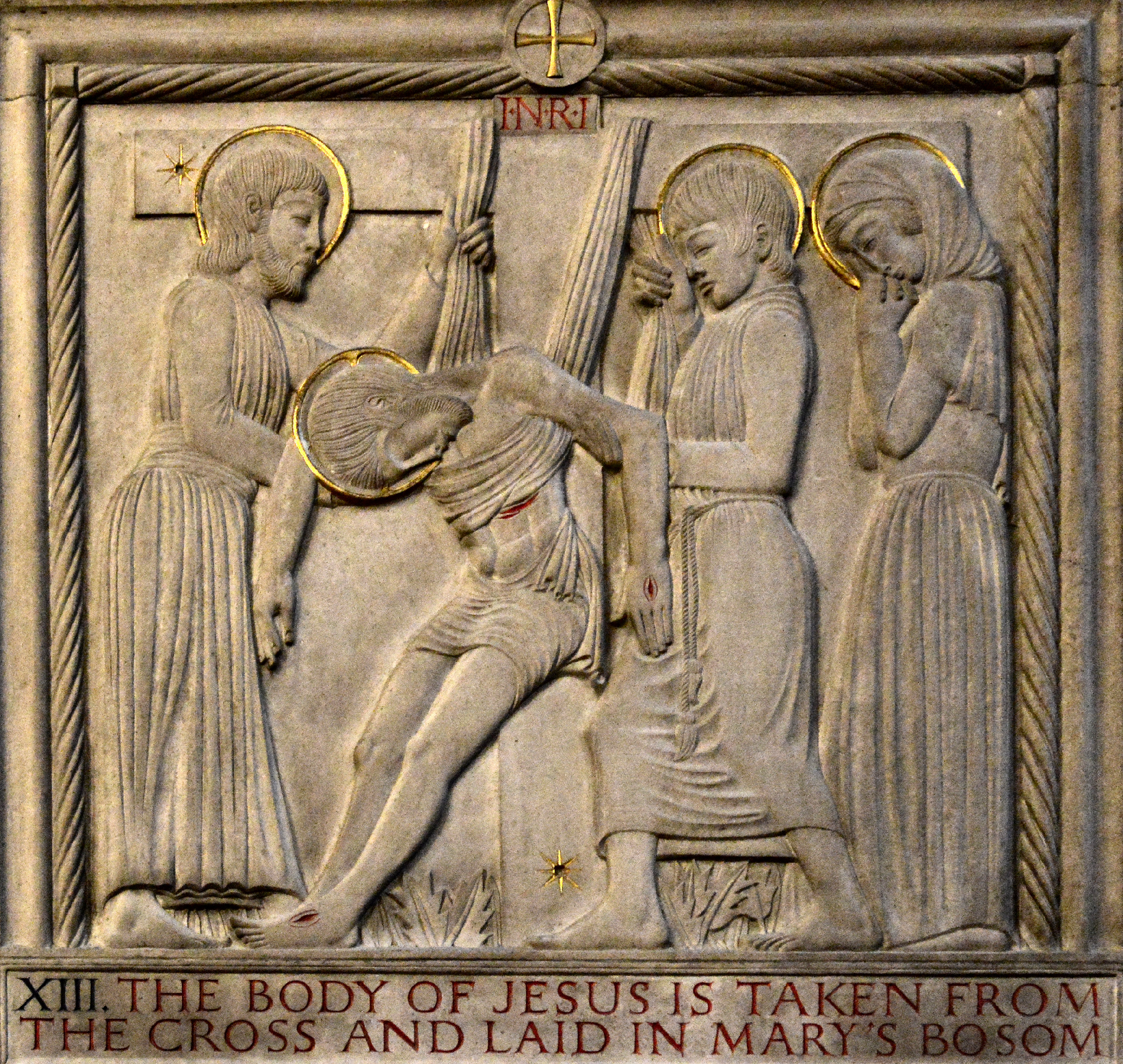
Westminster Cathedral, Stations of the Cross XIII

In 1913, after Gill and his wife became Catholics, they moved to Hopkin's Crank at Ditchling Common, two miles north of Ditchling village. There Gill worked primarily for Catholic clients, such as his 1914 commission for the 14 Stations of the Cross in Westminster Cathedral. Gill was a surprising choice for the commission as he had only recently become a Catholic and had been a sculptor for only three years. He was prepared to do the work more quickly and for a lower fee than more established sculptors would. Gill modelled both the Christ figure in panel ten and a soldier in the second panel on himself. The Stations were not universally well received when they were erected, with criticism of their simple appearance and how starkly they contrasted with the rest of the cathedral interior. A minority, which eventually included Nikolaus Pevsner, praised their uncluttered design and unsentimental treatment of the subject. They are now considered among Gill's most accomplished large-scale works. Gill submitted proposals for decorations and works in other parts of the Cathedral building and eventually his design for the Chapel of Saint George and the English Martyrs was commissioned.

Gill had been granted exemption from military service while working on the Stations of the Cross and when they were finished spent three months, from September 1918, as a driver at an RAF camp in Dorset before returning to Ditchling.

=== Ditchling Common 1918–1924 ===
After World War I, together with Hilary Pepler and Desmond Chute, Gill founded at Ditchling a guild association to promote the ideals of medieval, or pre-industrial, craft production, the Guild of St Joseph and St Dominic. The Guild emphasised manual labour as opposed to more modern industrial methods; for example, they did not use mechanised tools and considered craft working a form of holy worship. All members of the Guild were Catholics and most, including Gill, were also members of the Third Order of Saint Dominic, a third order of the Dominican Order. Lay members were not expected to follow the Dominicans' daily Liturgy of the Hours, a schedule of prayers from the Angelus at 6am to Compline at 9pm, but the group at Ditchling, unusually, did so. A chapel, designed by Gill, was built in the centre of the Guild's workshops and a wooden cross, with a Christ figure carved by Gill, was erected on a nearby hill. Gill had also taken to wearing a habit, often with a symbolic cord of chastity added. In his family home, Gill determined that the household was to be free of modern appliances, with no bathroom, water drawn by a pump, and cooking done on a log fire. One guest who brought a typewriter into the house was scolded for doing so. The children did not attend school.

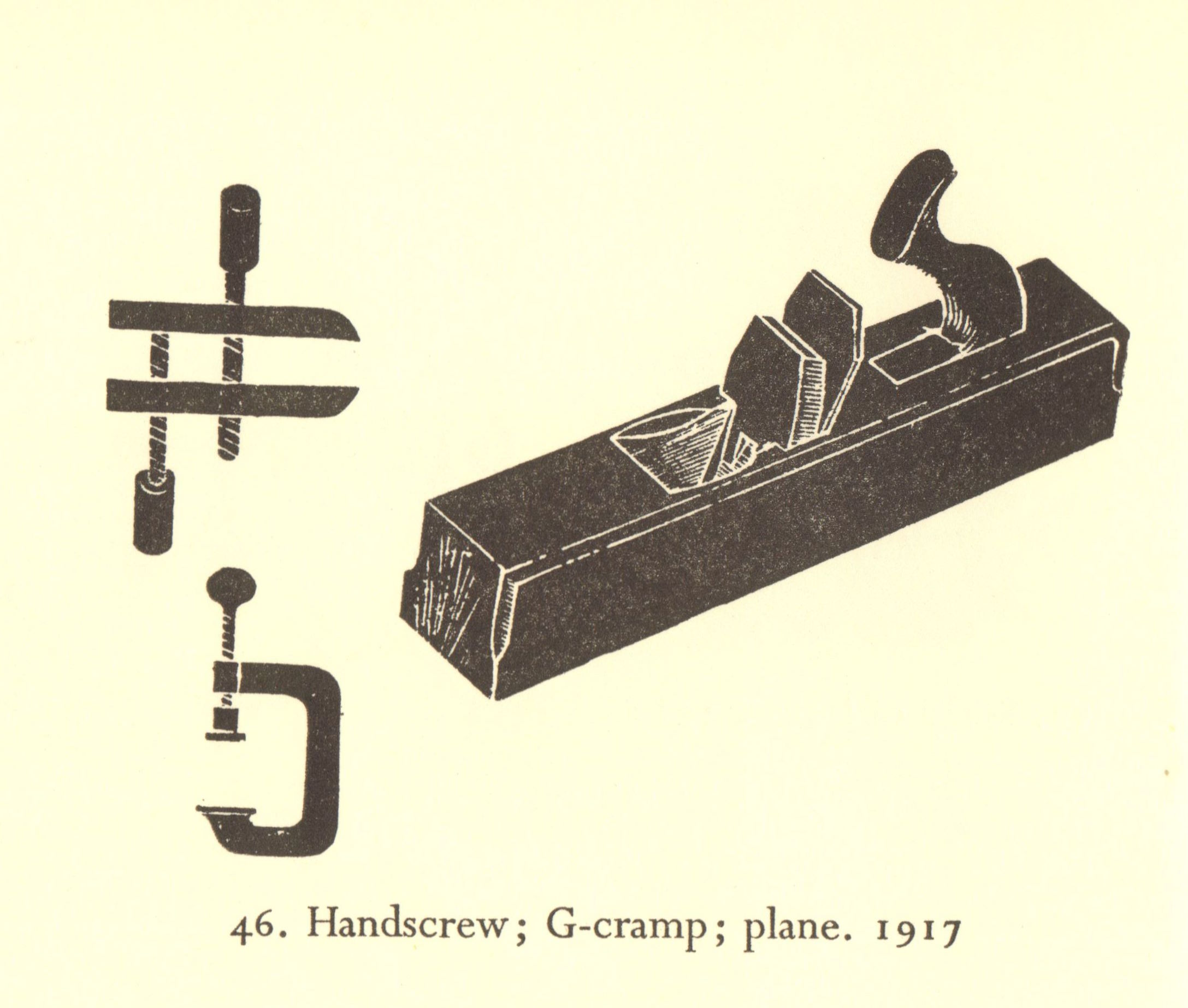
Engraving by Gill from Woodwork published by the St. Dominic Press

Alongside the Guild, Pepler set up the St Dominic's Press with a 100-year old Stanhope press that he bought. The Press printed books and pamphlets promoting the ideals of the Guild’s traditional craft techniques and also provided an outlet for Gill's engravings and woodcut illustrations. Gill and Pepler together produced issues of The Game, a small journal, mostly illustrated by Gill and containing articles on craft and social matters. The views promoted by Gill and Pepler in The Game and their other publications were often deliberately provocative, anti-capitalist, and opposed to industrialisation.

Along with his Guild work and illustrations, Gill designed several war memorials in this period. These included the Trumpington War Memorial in Cambridgeshire, the Chirk War Memorial in north Wales, the memorial at Ditchling, and the wall panel recording 228 names of the fallen in the ante-chapel at New College, Oxford. Gill also created the memorial at Briantspuddle in Dorset and, with Chute and Hilary Stratton, the monument at South Harting. Beside the main entrance to the British Museum, Gill designed and carved, with Joseph Cribb, the memorial inscription to the museum staff killed in the conflict; for the Victoria and Albert Museum, again with Cribb, he created the war memorial in the entrance hall. Previously, in 1911, Gill had cut the inscription for the foundation stone of the British Museum's new King Edward VII building. Gill's other significant work from this period was the Stations of the Cross that he carved, with Chute, for the Church of St Cuthbert in the Manningham area of Bradford.

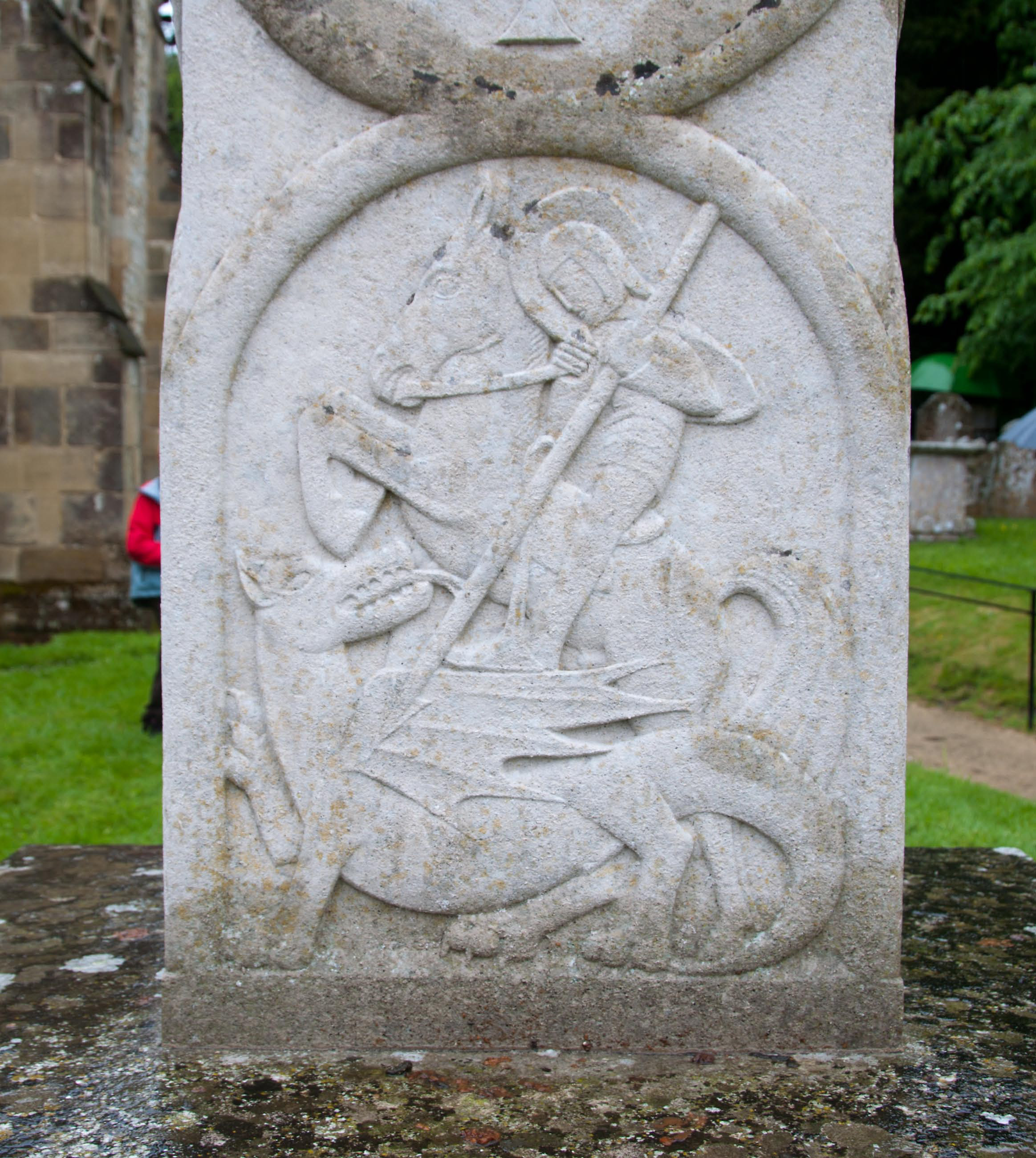
St George, detail of South Harting war memorial, West Sussex

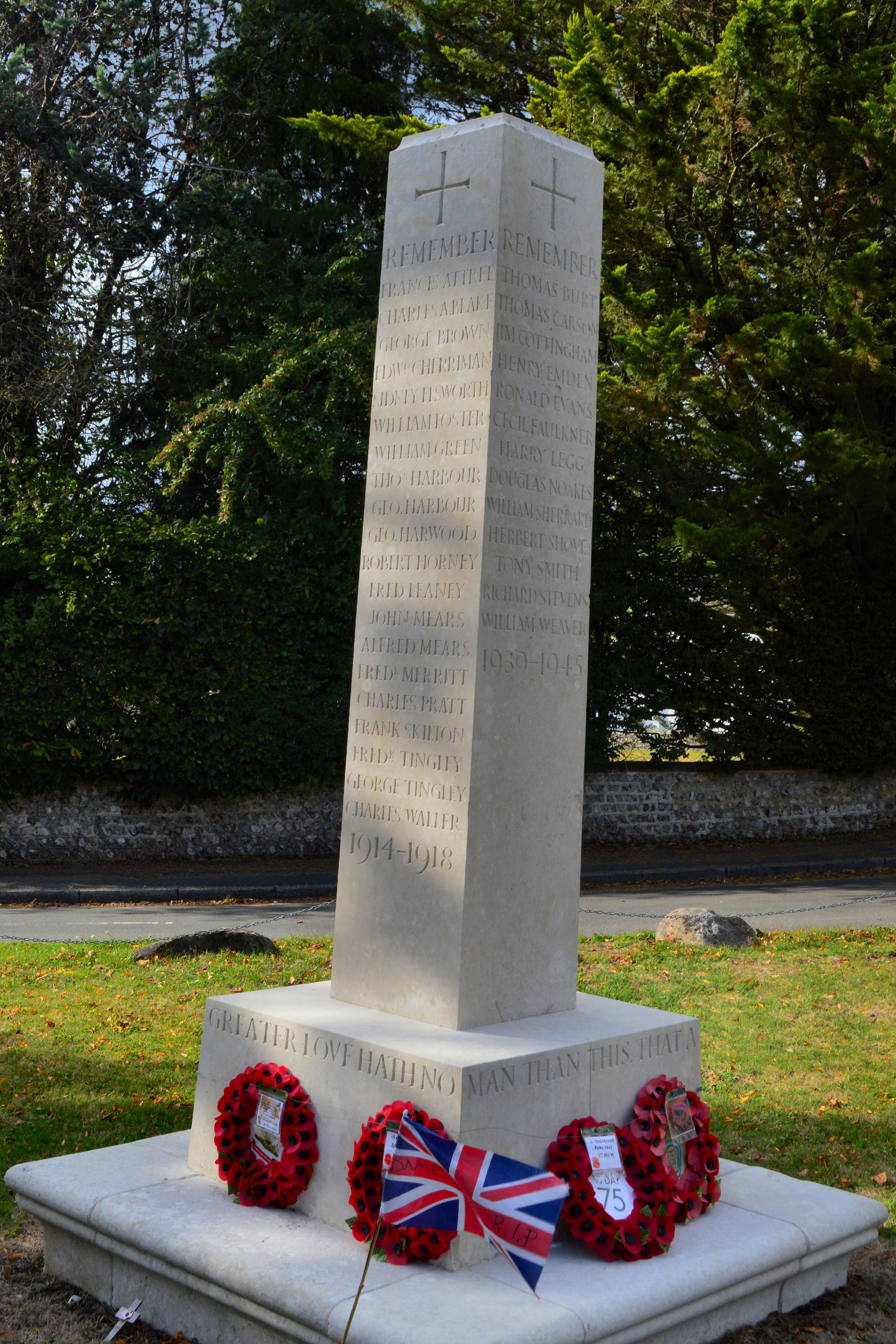
Ditchling war memorial, Sussex

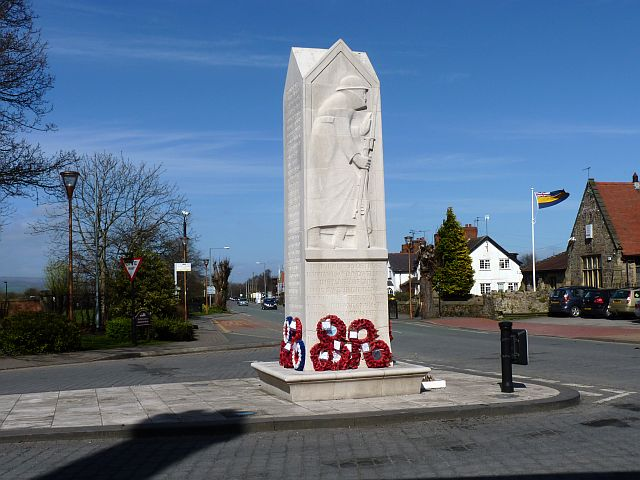
Chirk War Memorial, Wrexham

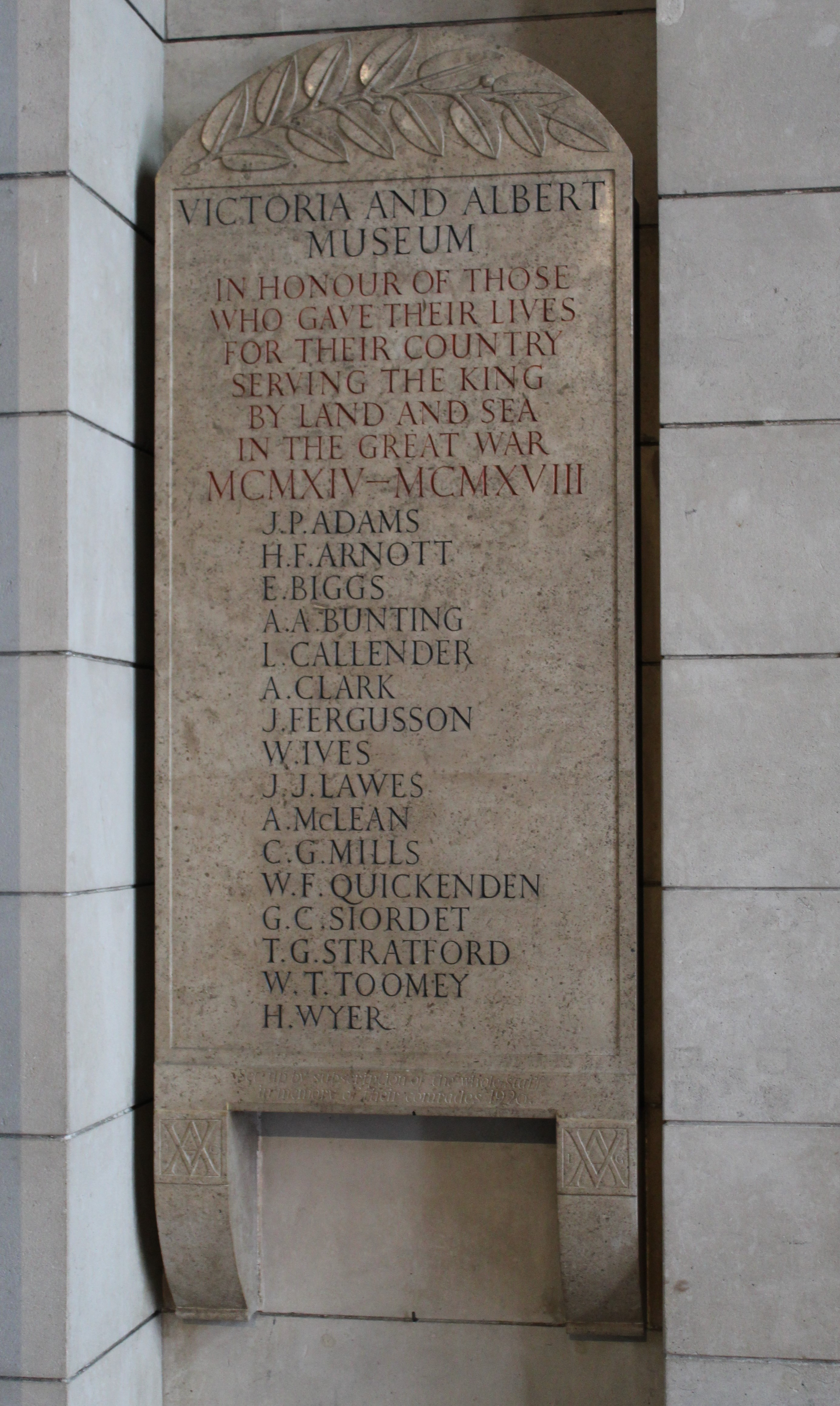
Victoria & Albert Museum staff war memorial

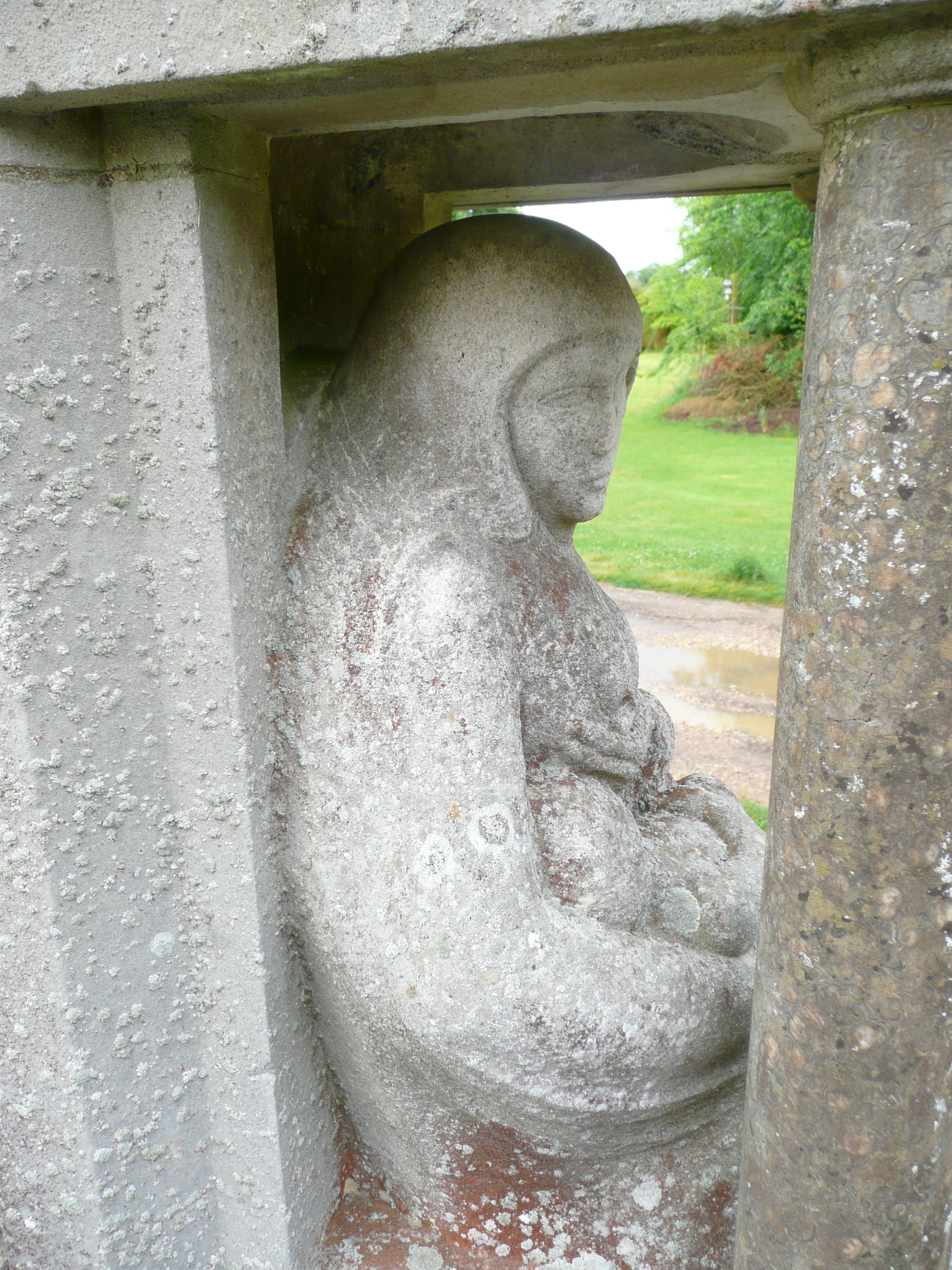
Detail of Briantspuddle war memorial, Dorset

Commissioned to produce a war memorial for the University of Leeds, Gill produced a frieze depicting the Cleansing of the Temple but showing contemporary merchants as the money-changers Jesus was driving from the Temple. While fully aware that this was an inappropriate subject for a war memorial and one likely to cause great offence in a commercial centre such as Leeds, Gill persisted with the design nonetheless. The cartoon-like nature of the finished frieze, which included the Hound of St Dominic knocking over a cash till, only added to the ferocity of the resulting uproar.

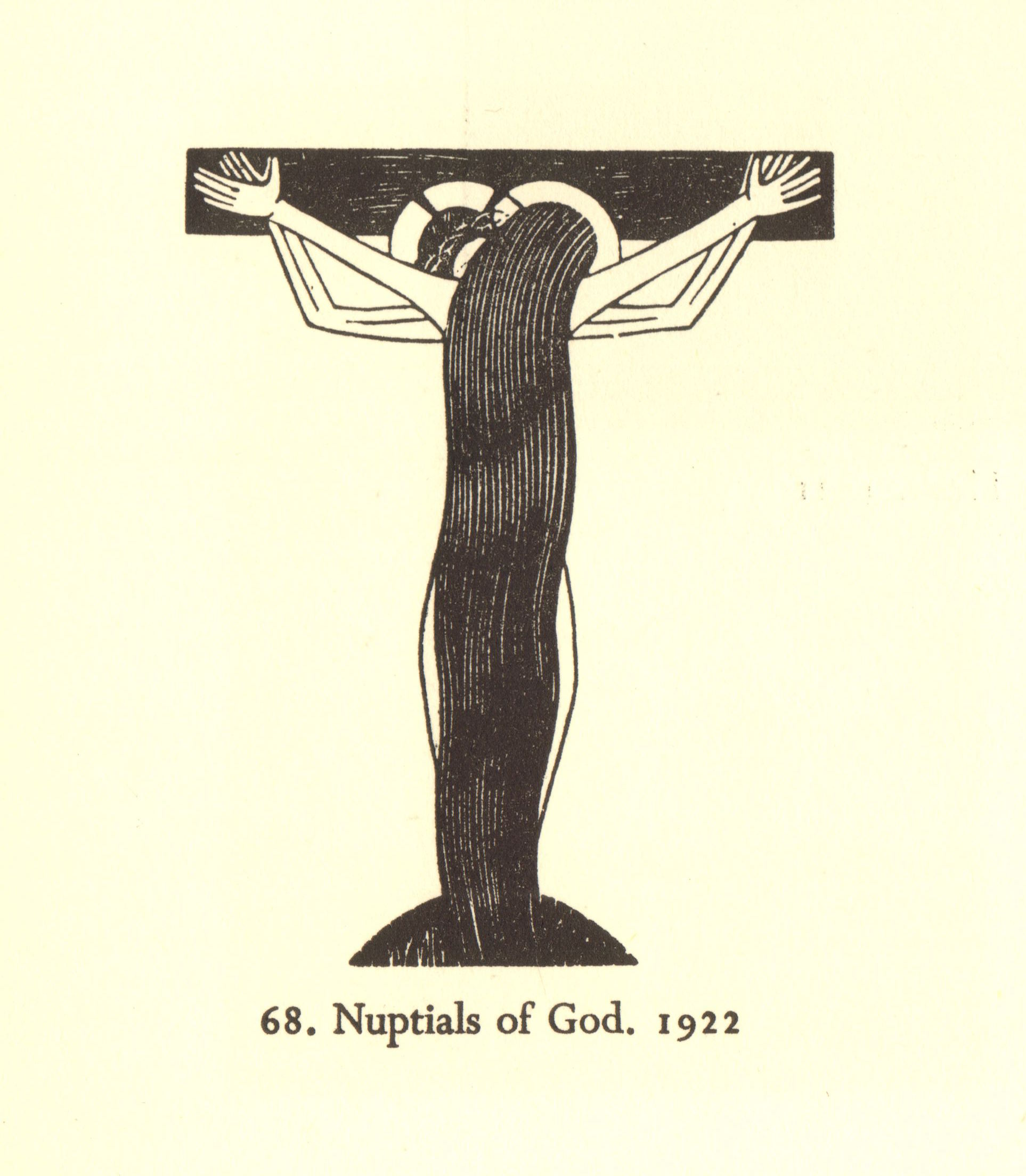
Nuptials of God

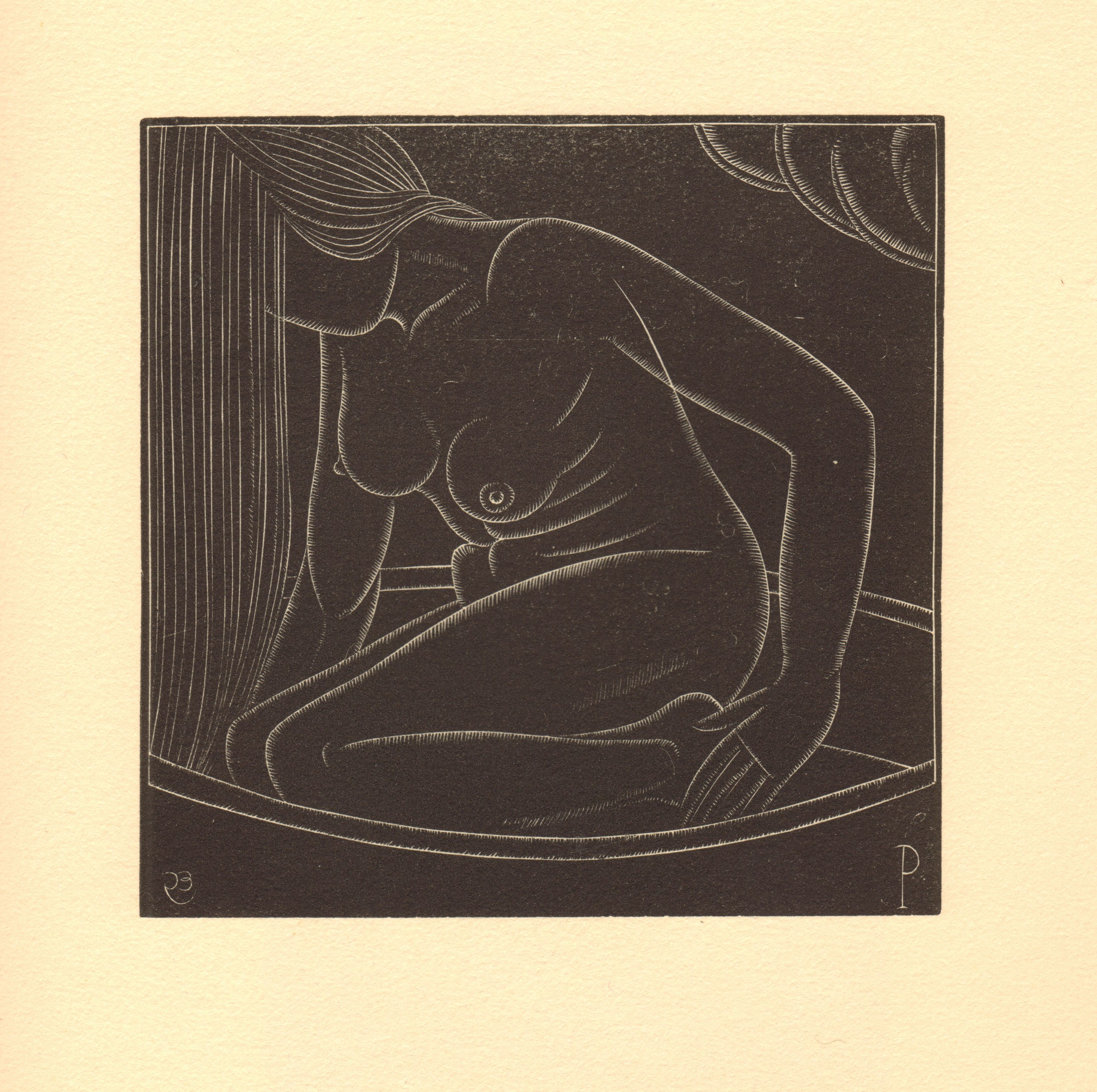
Girl in Bath, 1923

Even before the Leeds memorial controversy, Gill's series of illustrations that included the Nuptials of God, The Convert and Divine Lovers and his views on the sexual nature of Christianity were causing alarm within the Catholic hierarchy and distancing Gill from other members of the Ditchling community. The series of life-drawings and prints of his daughters, including Girl in Bath and Hair Combing done at Ditchling, were considered among Gill's finest works. The sexual abuse Gill was perpetrating on his two eldest daughters during the same period only became known after his death.

Professional craft workers joined the community, such that by the early 1920s the community had grown to 41 people, occupying several houses in the 20 acres surrounding the Guild's chapel and workshops. Visitors to the Common included G. K. Chesterton and Hilaire Belloc, whose Distributist ideas the Guild followed. Some young men who had been in combat in World War I came to stay for longer periods. These included Denis Tegetmeier, Reginald Lawson, and the artist and poet David Jones, who was to become engaged for a time to Gill's second daughter, Petra.

Gill became disillusioned with the direction of the Guild and fell out badly with his close friend Pepler, partly over the latter's wish to expand the community and form closer ties with Ditchling village and also because Gill's daughter Betty wanted to marry Pepler's son, David. Gill resigned from the Guild in July 1924 and, after considering other locations in Britain and Ireland, moved his family to a deserted monastery in the Black Mountains of Wales.

=== Capel-y-ffin 1924–1928 ===
In August 1924 the Gills left Ditchling and with two other families moved to a disused Anglican monastery, Llanthony Abbey, at Capel-y-ffin in the Black Mountains of Wales. The dilapidated building was high in an isolated valley about fourteen miles from Abergavenny. The monastery chapel was beyond repair, so a new one was quickly built and a Benedictine monk from Caldey Abbey was assigned to the group to hold a daily Mass. Donald Attwater arrived at Capel-y-ffin shortly before the Gills, David Jones and René Hague, Joan Gill's future husband, all joined shortly after. Joseph Cribb did not make the move to Wales but his younger brother, Lawrence Cribb (1898–1979), did and eventually became Gill's main assistant.

Within a few weeks of arriving at Capel-y-ffin, Gill completed Deposition, a black marble torso of Christ, and made The Sleeping Christ, a stone head now in Manchester City Art Gallery. In 1926 he completed a sculpture of Tobias and Sara for the library of St John's College, Oxford. A war memorial altarpiece in oak relief for Rossall School was completed in 1927.

When approached, in 1924, by Robert Gibbings to produce designs for the Golden Cockerel Press which he and his wife, Moira, had recently acquired, Gill initially refused to work with the couple as they were not Catholics. Gill changed his mind when they sought to publish a volume of poems by his sister Enid. The relationship between Gill and the Gibbingses grew such that throughout the following ten years Gill became the chief engraver and illustrator for the Golden Cockerel Press. Several of the resulting books, including The Song of Songs (1925), Troilus and Criseyde (1927), The Canterbury Tales (1928), and The Four Gospels (1931) are considered classics of specialist book production. Gill created striking designs that unified and integrated illustrations into the text and also created a new typeface for the Press. The erotic nature of The Song of Songs and of the illustrations for Edward Powys Mathers's Procreant Hymn caused considerable controversy in Catholic circles and led to protracted arguments between Gill and members of the clergy. The Golden Cockerel printed four of Gill's own books and he illustrated a further thirteen works for the press. In addition, between 1924 and his death, Gill wrote 38 books and illustrated a further 28.

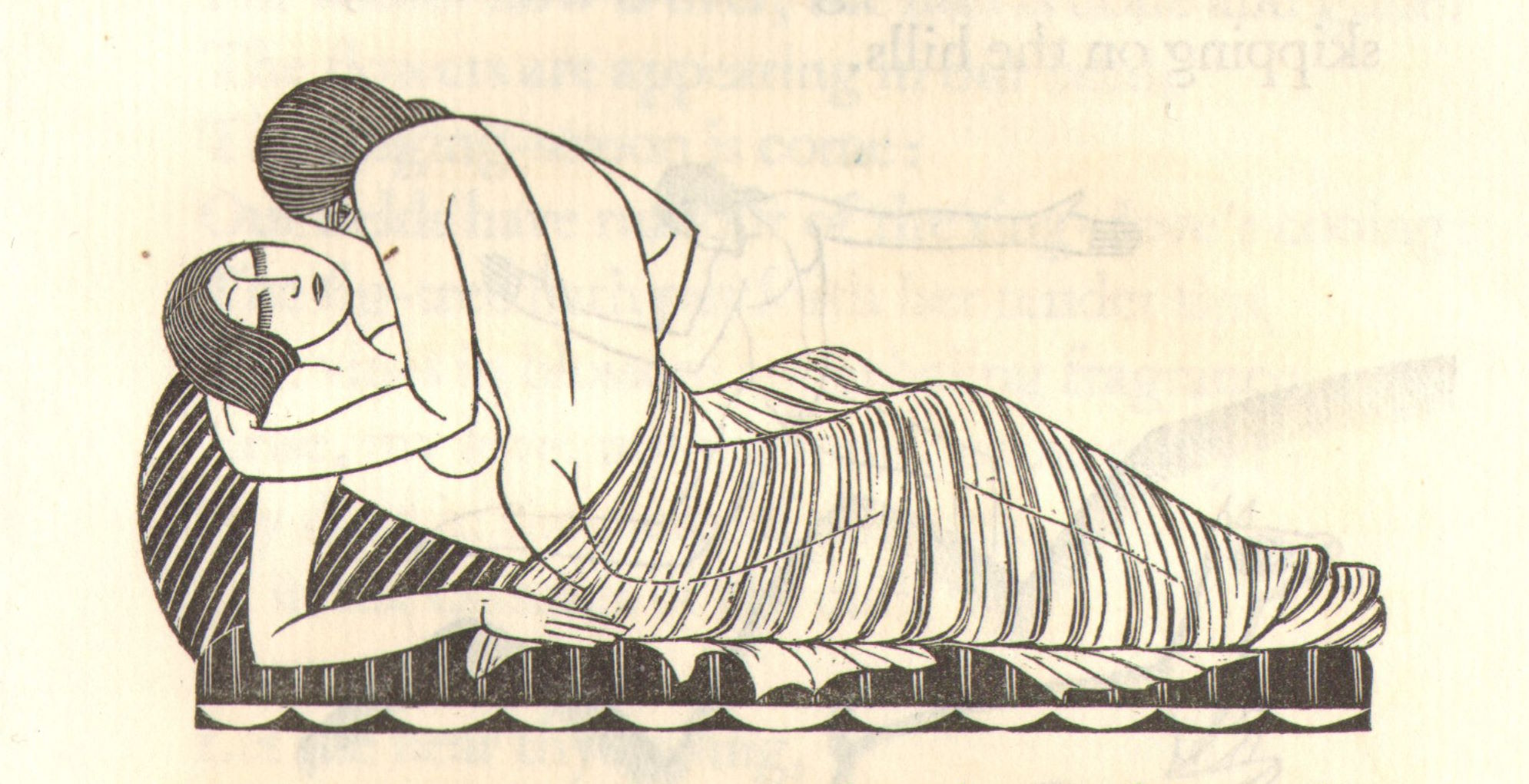
His left hand under my head, from Song of Songs

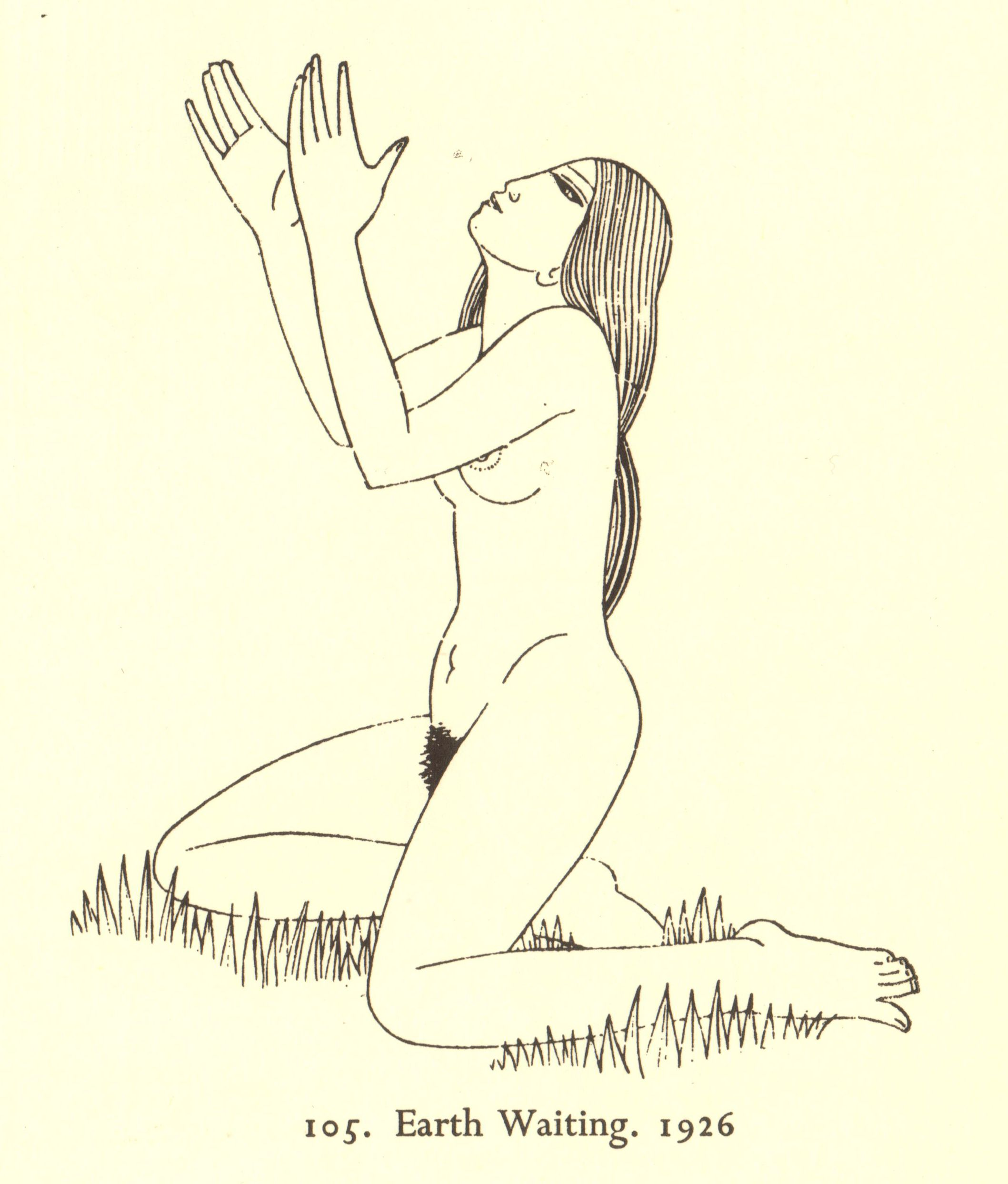
Earth waiting, from The Procreant Hymn

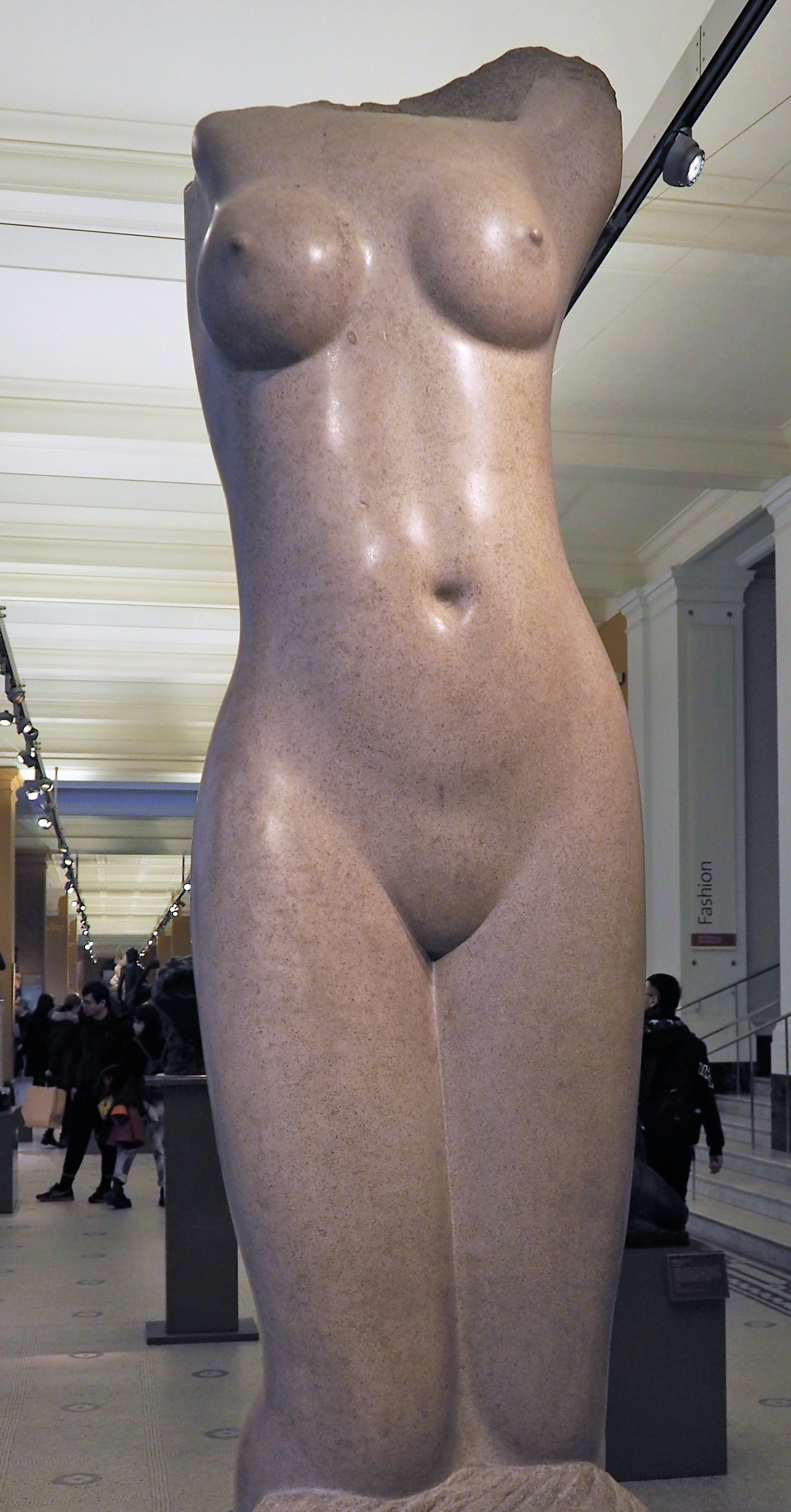
Mankind, 1927

The other key working relationship Gill established while at Capel-y-ffin was with Stanley Morison, the Typographic Advisor to the Monotype Corporation. Morison persuaded Gill to apply the skills and knowledge he had gained in letter cutting to fonts suitable for mechanical reproduction. It was at Capel that Gill designed the typefaces Perpetua (1925) and Gill Sans (1927 onwards) and began work on Solus (1929). Gill Sans is considered one of the most successful typefaces ever designed and remains in widespread use. (Note: The German diplomat Harry Graf Kessler visited Gill in Wales in January 1925. They had known each other before the First World War and Kessler wanted to persuade Gill to provide some calligraphy for a version of Virgil's Eclogues, which was to be published by Kessler's Cranach Press. Kessler recorded his impressions of his friend in his diary: "He really is an extraordinary and noteworthy personality, with his great artistic talent, utter repudiation of modern commercialism and eccentric piety translated into an all-embracing sensuousness".)

While living at Capel-y-ffin, Gill spent many weekends at Robert and Moira Gibbings' home in Waltham St Lawrence, enjoying the couple's unconventional and hedonistic lifestyle. He was also spending sizable amounts of time in Bristol with a group of young intellectuals centred around Douglas Cleverdon, a bookseller who published and distributed some of Gill's writings. From 1925 onwards Gills' secretary, and mistress, was Elizabeth Bill. Bill owned a villa set in several acres in the French Pyrenees at Salies-de-Béarn, which the Gills often visited. The Gill family spent the winter of 1926–27 there and Gill did many of the engravings for Troilus and Criseyde. For the last months of 1927 he worked in a studio in London at Glebe Place in Chelsea creating the sculpture originally known as Humanity and now called Mankind. The work, a giant torso, was modelled by Angela Gill and shown at the Goupil Gallery in London to considerable acclaim before being purchased by the artist Eric Kennington. Some years later Kennington offered the work to Whipsnade Zoo. The zoo refused the offer and the work is now in the Tate collection but displayed at the Victoria and Albert Museum.

It had been too impractical to transport the stone for Mankind to Capel-y-ffin and it was clear that the site had become too remote and isolated for Gill's increasing commercial workload, and by May 1928 he was seeking a new home for his family and workshops.

Gill Sans

Joanna Nova

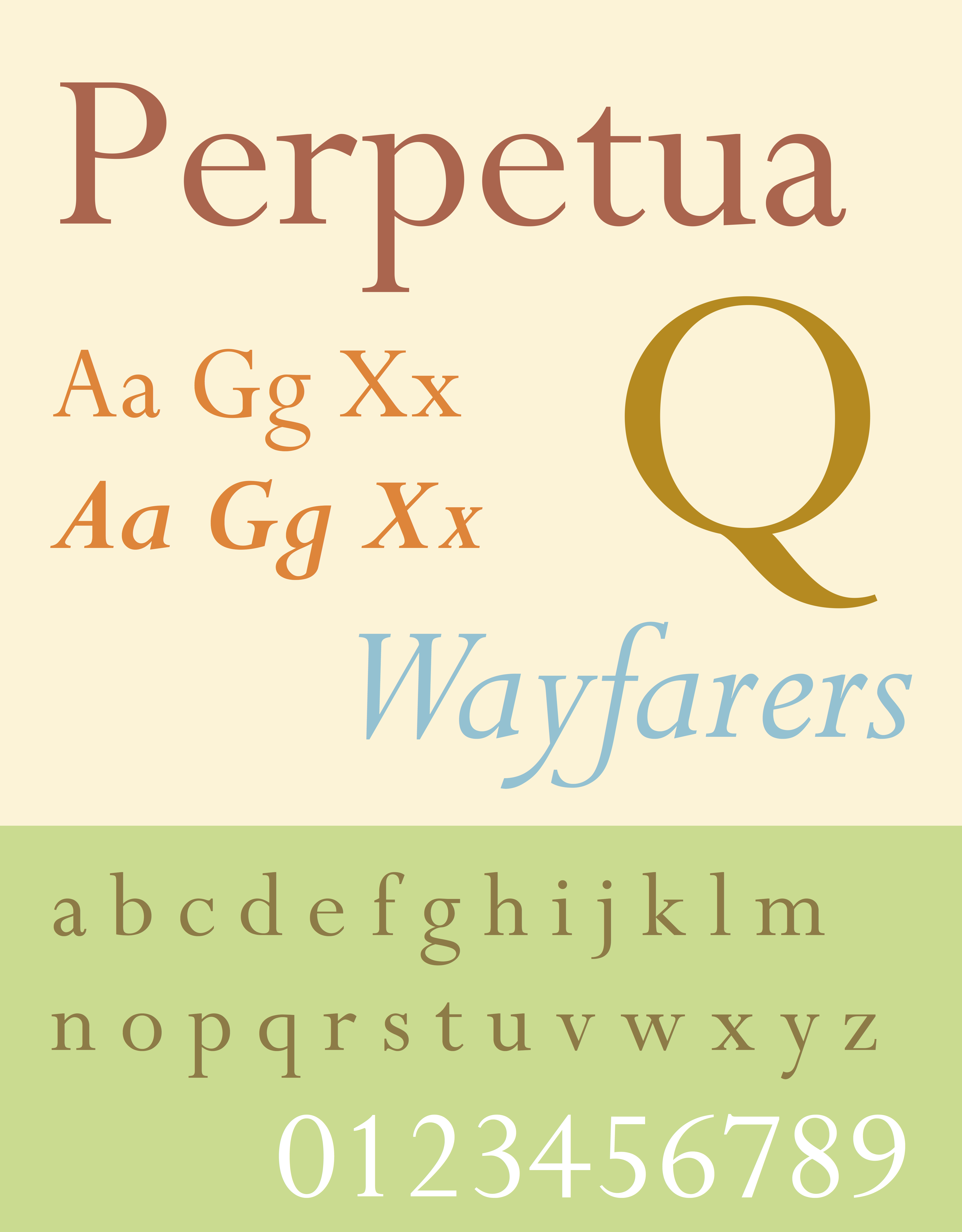
Perpetua

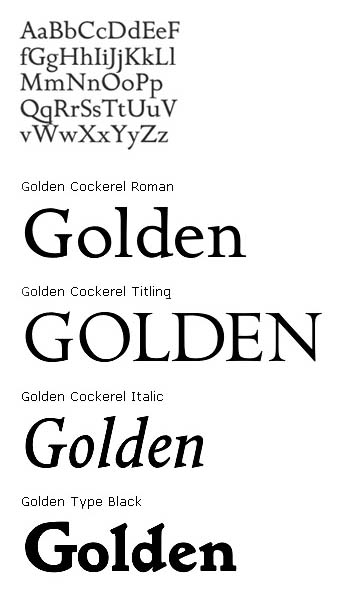
Golden Cockerel type

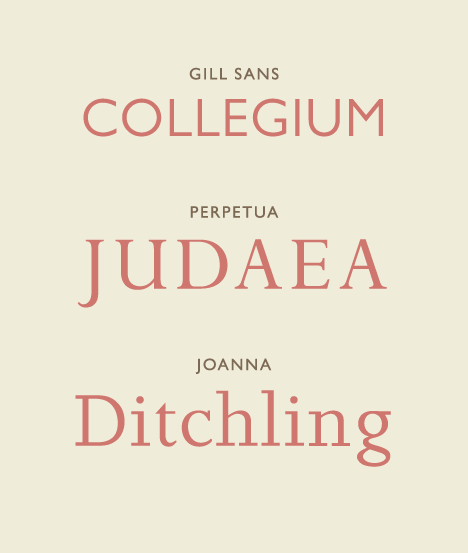
Three typefaces by Gill

=== Pigotts, Buckinghamshire 1928–1934 ===
In October 1928, the Gill family moved to Pigotts at Speen, five miles from High Wycombe in Buckinghamshire. Around a quadrangle with a central pigsty were a large farmhouse housing Eric and Mary Gill, a cottage for Petra and her husband Denis Tegetmeier and another for Joanna and René Hague. Stables and barns were converted to studios and workshops and to house printing presses. A chapel was fitted into one corner and licensed within six months for the saying of Mass.

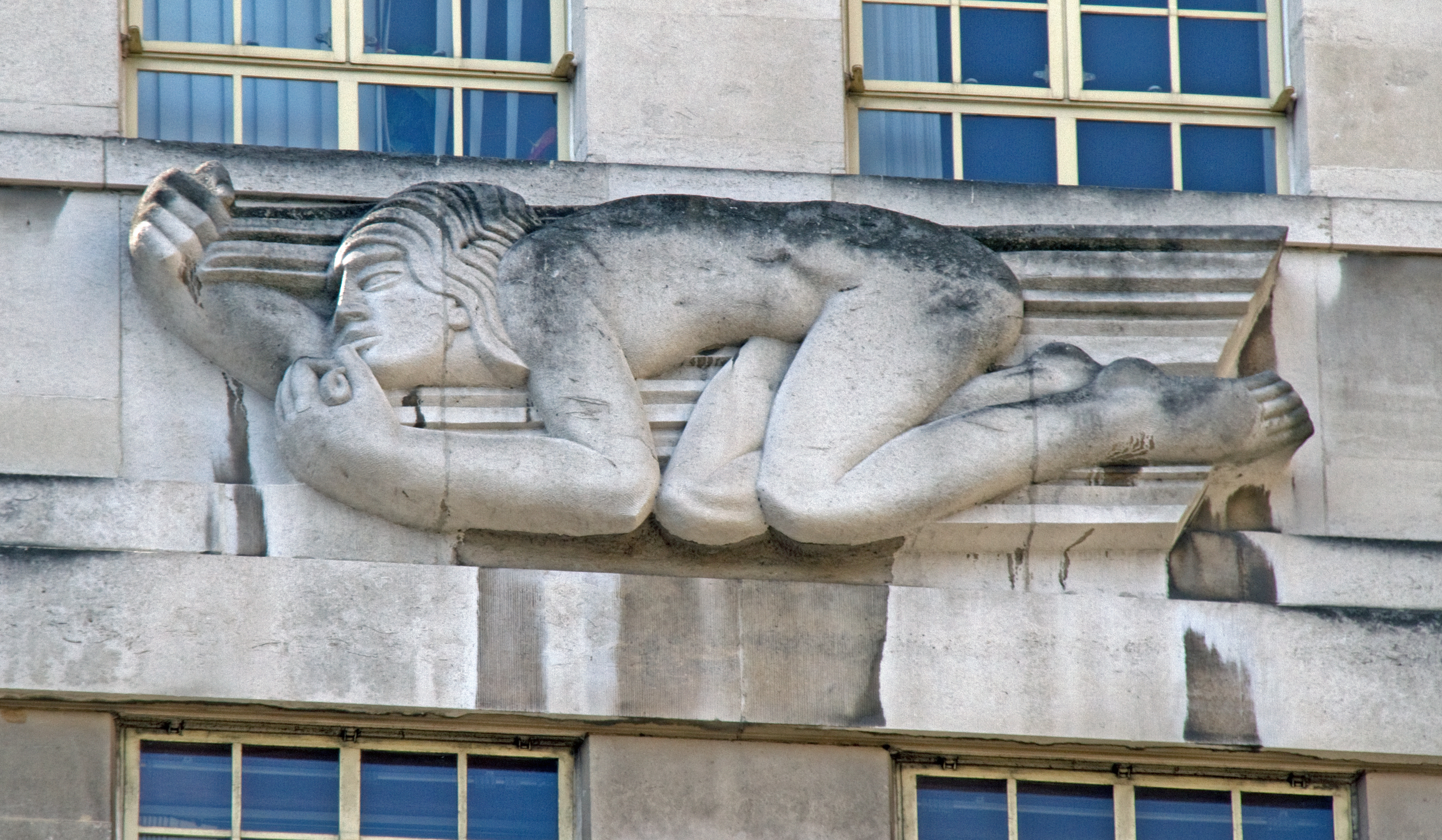
North Wind, St James's Park Station, London

The success of his 1928 exhibition at the Goupil Gallery had raised Gill's profile considerably and led to Charles Holden commissioning him to lead a team of five sculptors, including Henry Moore, in creating some of the external sculptures for the new headquarters building of the London Electric Railway, the forerunner of London Underground. Gill started on the project within days of arriving at Pigotts and worked on site in London from November 1928 to carve three of eight relief sculptures on the theme of The Four Winds for the building.

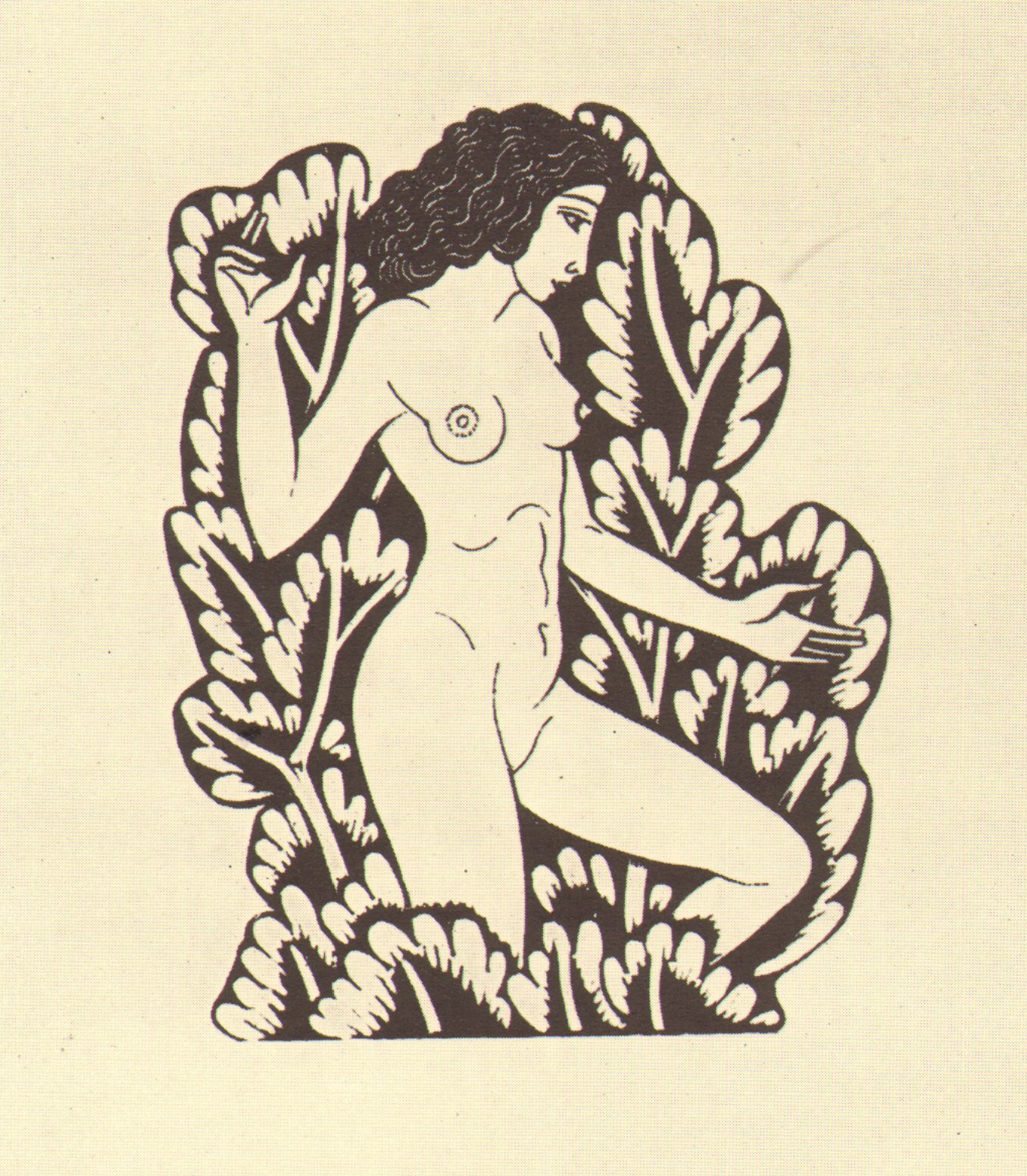
Belle Sauvage IV. From the title page of Art-Nonsense

Art-Nonsense And Other Essays by Eric Gill was published in 1929 and marked the first commercial use of the Perpetua typeface. The frontispiece of the book had an engraving of Belle Sauvage, an image of a naked women stepping out of some woods. The various versions of Belle Sauvage became among the most popular of Gill's illustrations and were modelled by Beatrice Warde, a historian of typography, an executive of the Monotype Corporation and sometimes Gill's lover.

In 1929, Douglas Cleverdon published Engravings by Eric Gill. This edition reproduced more than a hundred of Gill's engravings on wood and metal up to the year 1927, and also included a complete chronological list of engravings, and a preface by Gill.

By 1930 Gladys Gill had divorced her second husband after her first, Ernest Laughton, had been killed in the Battle of the Somme, and she and Eric appear, from his diary entries, to have resumed their incestuous relationship. Later that same year, the diaries record what Gill called his "experiments" with a dog. In September 1930, he was taken seriously ill with a variety of symptoms, including amnesia, and spent several weeks in hospital.

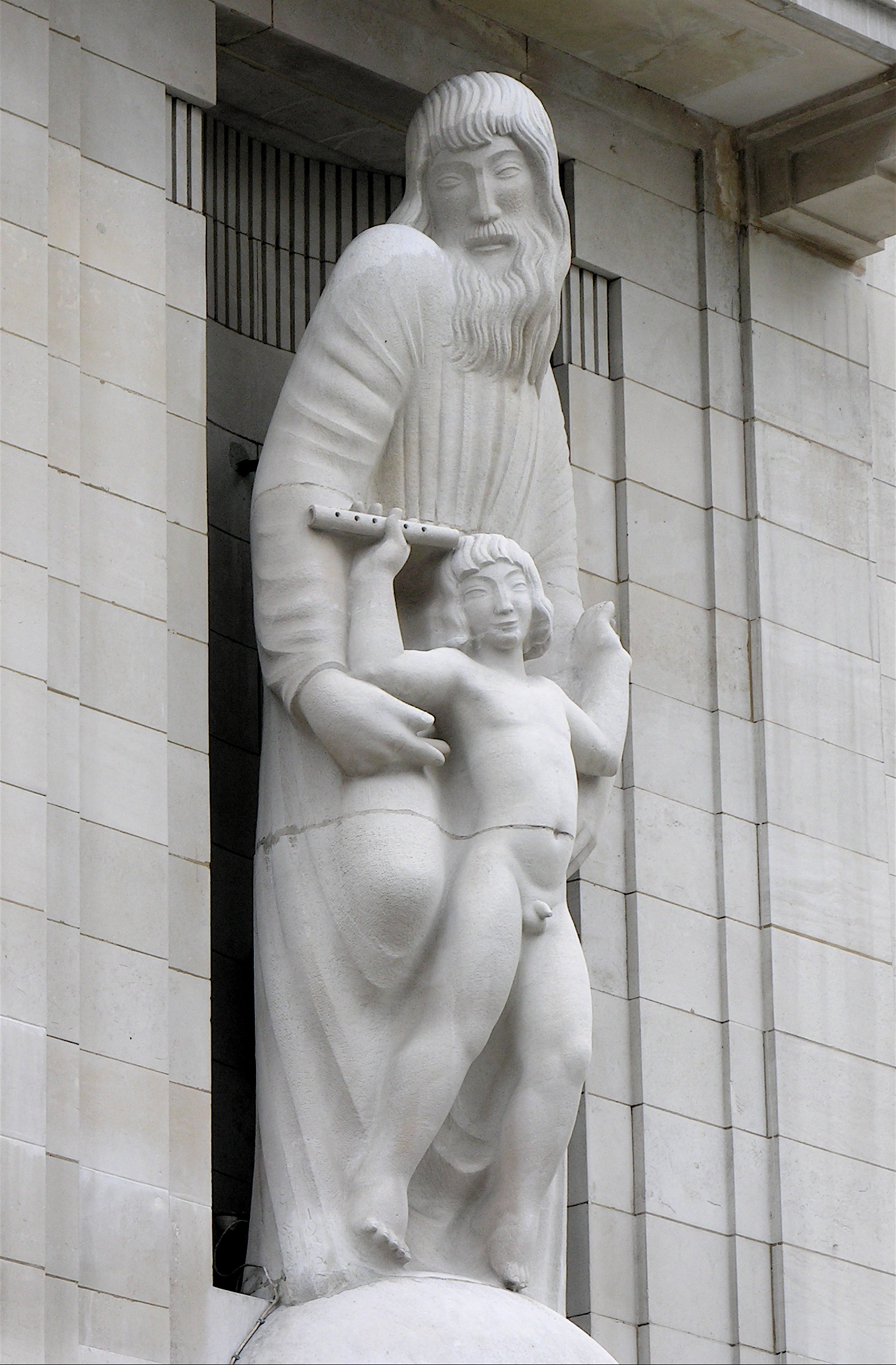
Prospero and Ariel, BBC Broadcasting House

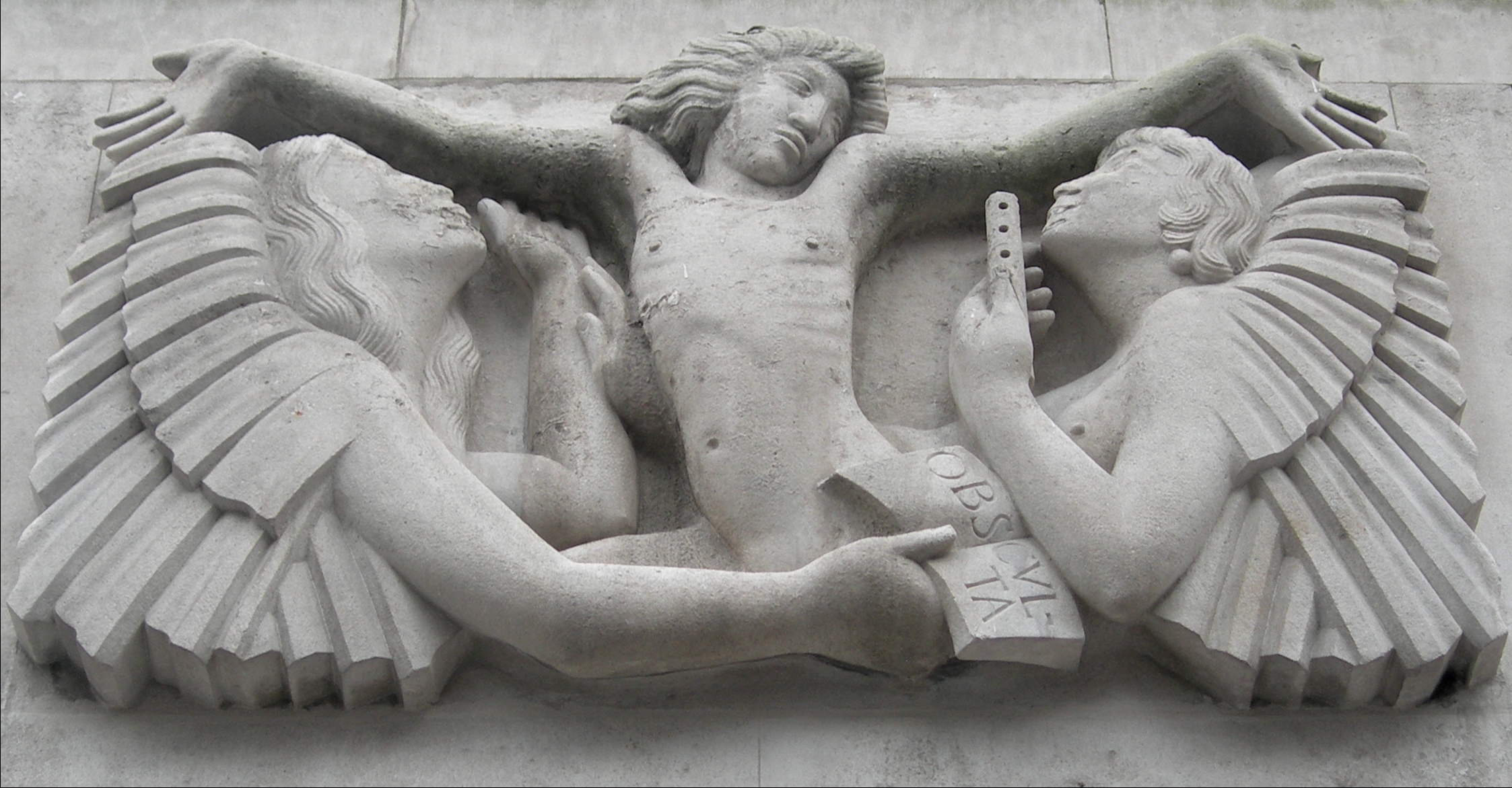
Ariel between Wisdom and Gaiety with the Latin inscription obsculta (obey), BBC Broadcasting House

The following two years were among the most creatively accomplished of Gill's career, with several achievements. The Hague and Gill press was established at Pigotts in 1931 and eventually printed 16 of Gill's own books and booklets, while he also illustrated six other books for the company. For the Hague and Gill press he created the Joanna typeface, which was eventually adapted for commercial use by Monotype. He completed The Four Gospels, widely considered to be the finest of all the books produced by the Golden Cockerel Press, and began working on the sculpture Prospero and Ariel for the BBC's Broadcasting House in London. Throughout 1931 and into 1932, Gill worked on Prospero and Ariel, and four other works for the BBC, on site in central London. Carving in the open air up on scaffolding in the middle of London further increased Gill's public profile. Although Gill had accepted the BBC's choice of subject matter when he took the commission, he did not see its relevance and frequently claimed that the figures he created represented God the Father and God the Son, the latter complete with the marks of the stigmata.

The Midland Hotel, Morecambe was built in 1932–33 by the London Midland & Scottish Railway to the Art Deco design of Oliver Hill and included several works by Gill, Marion Dorn, and Eric Ravilious. For the project Gill, with Lawrence Cribb and Donald Potter, produced two seahorses, modelled as Morecambe shrimps, for the outside entrance; a round plaster relief on the ceiling of the circular staircase inside the hotel; a decorative wall map of the north-west of England; and a large stone relief of Odysseus being welcomed from the sea by Nausicaa for the entrance lounge. While working in Morecambe, Gill met May Reeves, who became a regular visitor to Pigotts before moving there to run a small school and becoming Gill's resident mistress for several years.

=== Jerusalem and Pigotts, 1934–1938 ===
In 1934 Gill, with Lawrence Cribb, visited Jerusalem to work at the Palestine Archaeological Museum, now the Rockefeller Archaeological Museum. There they carved a stone bas-relief of the meeting of Asia and Africa above the front entrance, together with ten stone reliefs illustrating different cultures, and a gargoyle fountain in the inner courtyard. He also carved stone signage throughout the museum in English, Hebrew and Arabic.

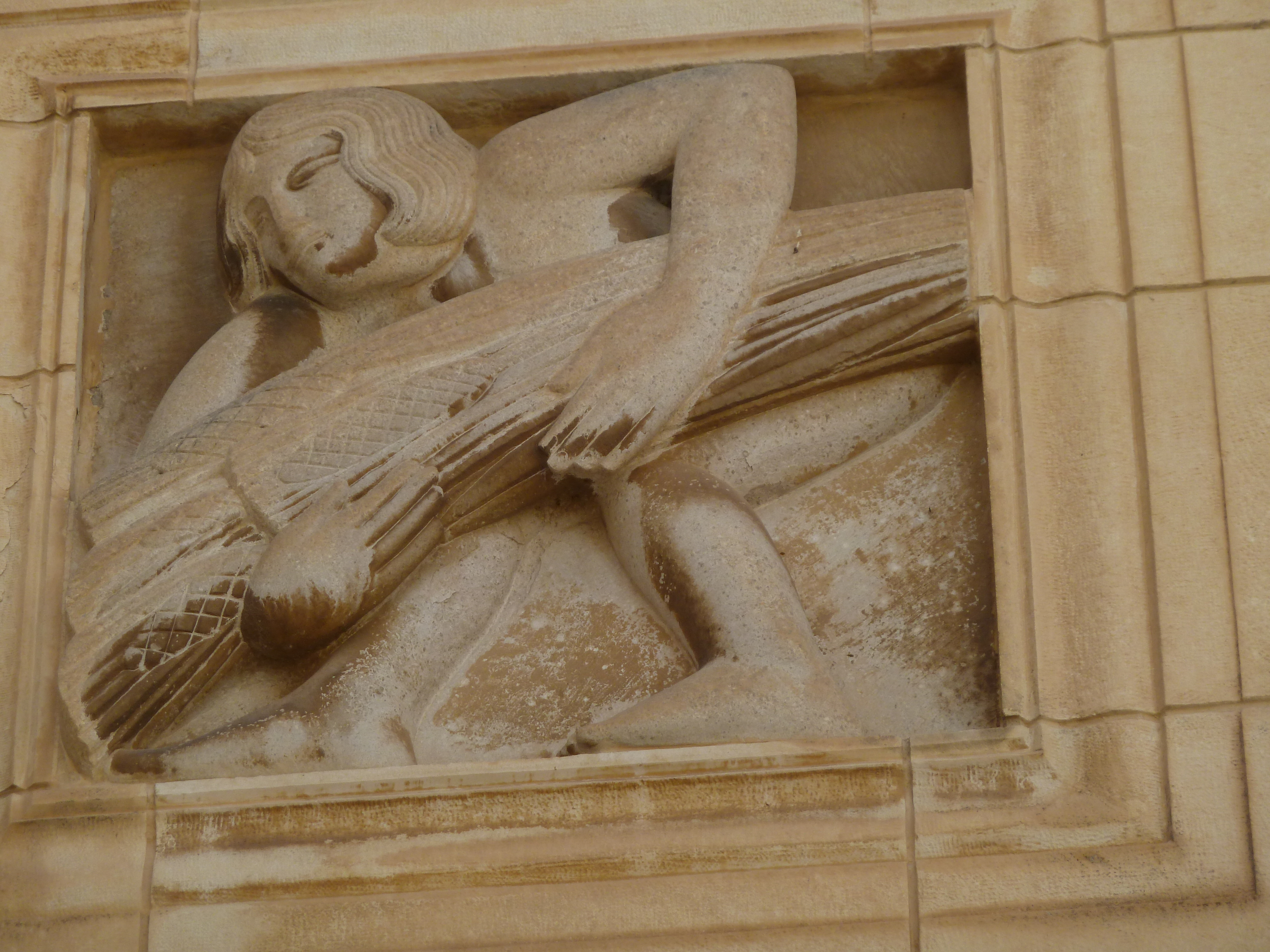
Canaanite culture, the Rockefeller Museum, Jerusalem, 1934

Gill's two visits to Jerusalem had a profound impact on his state of mind. He became increasingly unhappy with the impact of humanity upon the world and also become convinced of his own role as one chosen by God to change society. Returning to England, Gill's mood of pessimism deepened with the death of his son-in-law, David Pepler, and he became increasingly antagonistic towards the Church and towards other artists. Paradoxically, alongside this despondent world view Gill dropped his long-standing opposition to the use of modern home comforts and appliances. A bathroom was installed at Pigotts, a chauffeur and a gardener were appointed and his secretaries were allowed to use typewriters. Religious observance was no longer expected of the workshop staff and among the additional apprentices and assistants Gill employed were non-Catholics, including Walter Ritchie. Prudence Pelham, the daughter of the Earl of Chichester, became Gill's only female apprentice. During his career, Gill employed at least twenty-seven apprentices including his nephew John Skelton, Hilary Stratton, Desmond Chute, David Kindersley and Donald Potter.

Gill's 1935 essay All Art is Propaganda marked a complete reversal of his previous belief that artists should not concern themselves with political activity. He became a supporter of social credit and later moved towards a socialist position. In 1934, Gill contributed art to an exhibition mounted by the left-wing Artists' International Association, and defended the exhibition against accusations in The Catholic Herald that its art was "anti-Christian". Gill became a regular speaker at left-wing meetings and rallies throughout the second half of the 1930s. He was adamantly opposed to fascism, and was one of the few Catholics in Britain to openly support the Spanish Republicans. Gill became a pacifist and helped set up the Catholic peace organisation Pax with E. I. Watkin and Donald Attwater. Later, Gill joined the Peace Pledge Union and supported the British branch of the Fellowship of Reconciliation.

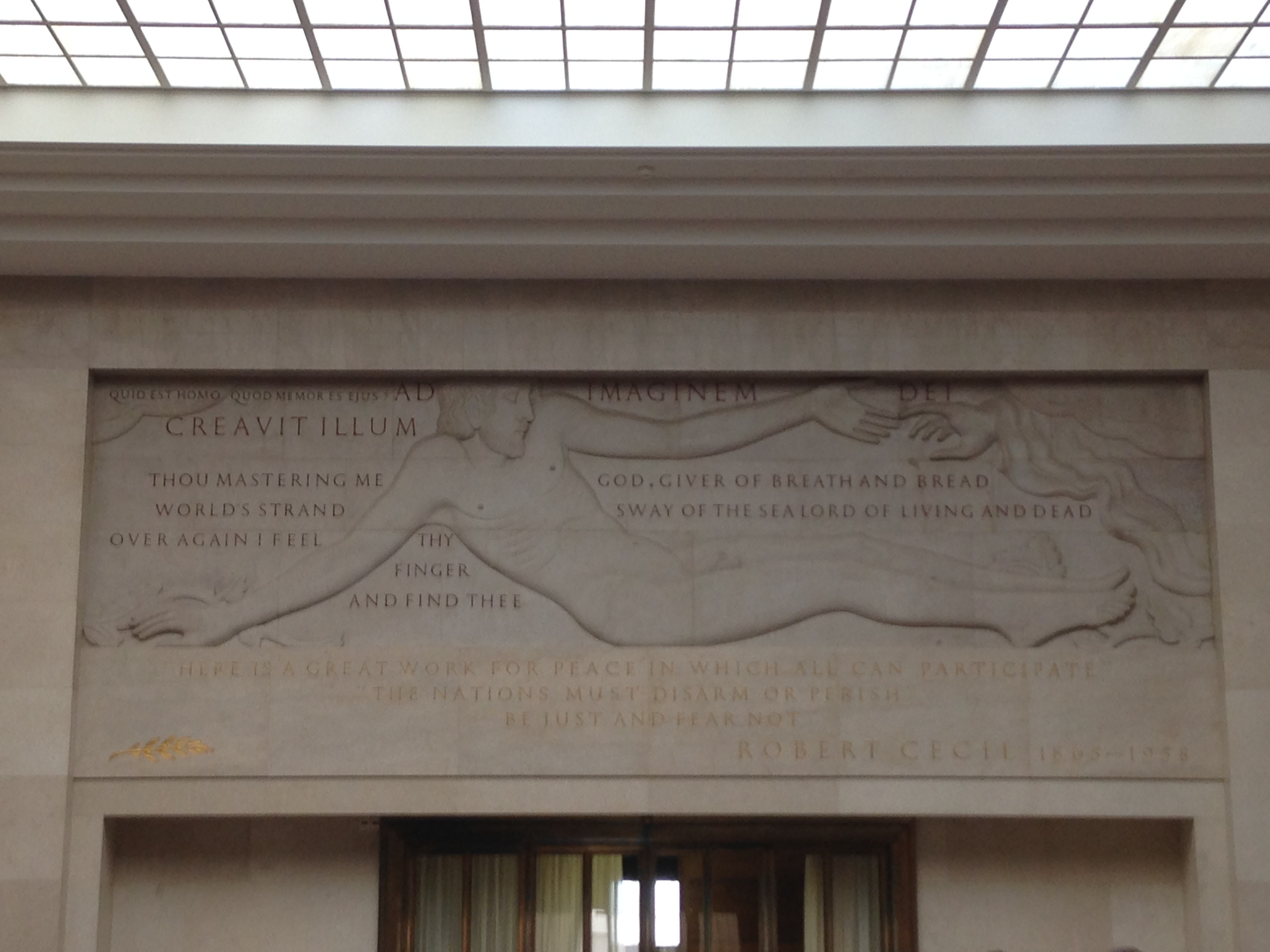
The Creation of Man, 1938

Gill was commissioned to produce a sequence of seven bas-relief panels for the façade of The People's Palace, now the Great Hall of Queen Mary University of London, which opened in 1936. In 1937, he designed the background of the first George VI definitive stamp series for the post office. In 1938 Gill was commissioned to create a mammoth artwork for the Palace of Nations building in Geneva, as the British Government's gift to the League of Nations. Gill's original proposal was to create a larger, international, version of the Moneychangers frieze that had caused such outrage in Leeds years earlier, but after objections from delegates to the League, submitted an alternative scheme. The Creation of Man flanked by Man's Gifts to God and God's Gifts to Man are three marble bas-reliefs in seventeen sections and constitute the largest single work Gill created during his career but are not considered among his finest works.

In 1935, Gill was elected an Honorary Associate of the Institute of British Architects and in 1937 was made a Royal Designer for Industry, the highest British award for designers, by the Royal Society of Arts, and became a founder-member of the RSA's Faculty of Royal Designers for Industry when it was established in 1938. In April 1937, Gill was elected an associate member of the Royal Academy. Quite why Gill was offered, let alone accepted, these honours from institutions he had openly reviled throughout his career is unclear.

=== Final works, 1939–1940 ===
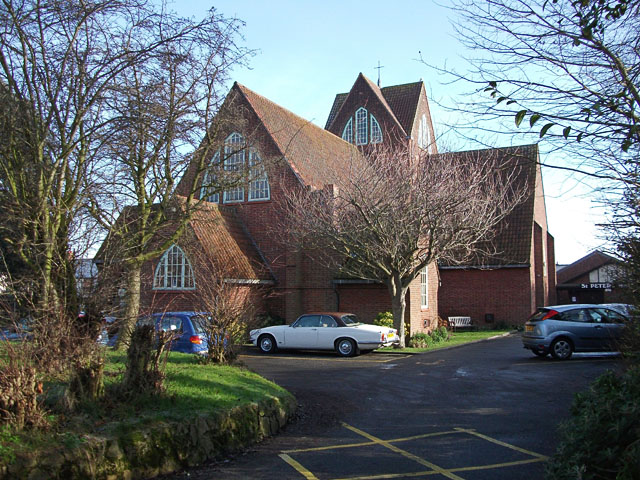
Church of St Peter, Gorleston-on-Sea (1938–9)

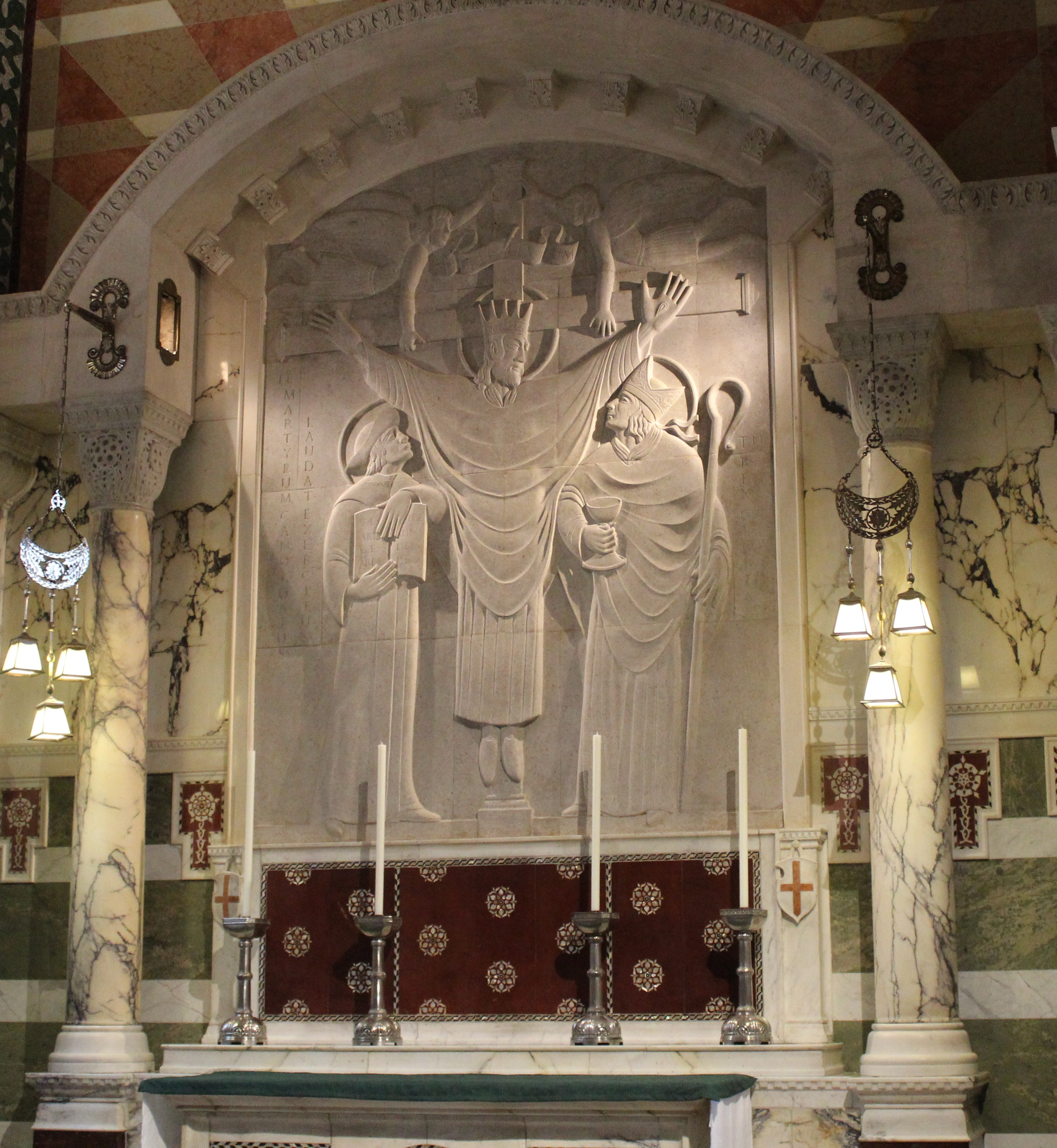
Altar of the Chapel of St George and the English Martyrs, Westminster Cathedral

During 1938 and 1939 Gill designed his only complete piece of architecture, the Catholic Church of St Peter the Apostle at Gorleston-on-Sea. He designed the building around a central altar which, at the time, was considered a radical departure from the Catholic practice of the altar being at the east end of a church.

Gill's final publications included Twenty-Five Nudes and Drawings from Life both of which included drawings of Daisy Hawkins, the teenage daughter of the Gills' housekeeper with whom Gill began an affair in 1937. The affair lasted two years during which time Gill drew her on an almost daily basis. When Hawkins was sent away from Pigotts, to the boarding house at Capel-y-ffin run by Betty Gill, Eric Gill followed her there to continue the relationship.

Among Gill's last sculptures were a series of commissions for Guildford Cathedral. He spent time between October and December 1939 working at Guildford, on scaffolding carving the figure of John the Baptist. He also worked on a set of panels depicting the stations of the cross for the Anglican St Alban's Church in Oxford, finishing the drawings three weeks before he died and completing nine of the pieces himself. For the Chapel of Saint George and the English Martyrs, in Westminster Cathedral, Gill designed a low relief sculpture to occupy the wall behind the altar. Gill's design showed a life-sized figure of Christ the Priest on the cross attended by Sir Thomas More and John Fisher. Gill died before the work was completed and Lawrence Cribb was tasked with finishing the piece by the Cathedral authorities who insisted he remove an element of Gill's original design, a figure of a pet monkey. When the chapel was eventually opened to the public this censorship of Gills' last work was a matter of some considerable controversy.

From the end of 1939 into the middle of 1940, Gill had a series of illnesses, including rubella, but managed to write his autobiography that summer. Gill died of lung cancer in Harefield Hospital in Middlesex on the morning of Sunday 17 November 1940 and, after a funeral mass at the Pigotts chapel, was buried in Speen's Baptist churchyard.

After Gill died an inventory of more than 750 of his carved inscriptions was compiled, in addition to over 100 stone sculptures and reliefs, 1000 engravings, the several typeface designs he created and his 300 printed works, including books, articles and pamphlets.

== Paedophilia, incest, and sexual abuse ==
In his personal diaries, Gill described his sexual abuse of his adolescent daughters, an incestuous relationship with at least one of his sisters, and bestiality. Since these revelations became public in 1989, there have been calls for works by Gill to be removed from public buildings and art collections. This aspect of Gill's life was little known beyond his family and friends until the publication of the 1989 biography by Fiona MacCarthy. A 1966 biography by Robert Speaight mentioned none of it.

Gill's daughter Petra Tegetmeier, who was alive at the time of the MacCarthy biography, described her father as having "endless curiosity about sex" and that "we just took it for granted", and told her friend Patrick Nuttgens she was unembarrassed. The children were educated at home and, according to Tegetmeier, she was then unaware of how her father's behaviour would seem to others. Despite the acclaim the book received, and the widespread revulsion towards aspects of Gill's sexual life that followed publication, MacCarthy received some criticism for revealing Gill's incest while Tegetmeier was still living. Others, like Bernard Levin, thought she had been too indulgent towards Gill. MacCarthy commented:

[A]fter the initial shock, ... as Gill's history of adulteries, incest, and experimental connection with his dog became public knowledge in the late 1980s, the consequent reassessment of his life and art left his artistic reputation strengthened. Gill emerged as one of the twentieth century's strangest and most original controversialists, a sometimes infuriating, always arresting spokesman for man's continuing need of God in an increasingly materialistic civilisation, and for intellectual vigour in an age of encroaching triviality.

Despite MacCarthy's revelations, for several years Gill's reputation as an artist continued to grow but, following the exposure of other high-profile paedophiles, this changed with groups and individuals calling for the removal of works by Gill.

In 1998, a group, Ministers and Clergy Sexual Abuse Survivors, called for Gill's Stations of the Cross to be removed from Westminster Cathedral, leading to a debate within the British Catholic press. There were calls for Gill's statue of St Michael the Archangel to be removed from St Patrick's Catholic Church in Dumbarton in Scotland. In 2016, some residents in Ditchling objected to a proposal to erect a plaque by the village war memorial which would have identified Gill as the maker of the monument. In January 2022, a man climbed the façade of Broadcasting House and damaged the statue of Prospero and Ariel with a hammer, while another man shouted about Gill's paedophilia. Some 2,500 people had previously signed a petition calling on the BBC to take the work down. In May 2023 the statue was again attacked by a man wielding a hammer. Since April 2025, the restored statue has been encased in a protective glass box to prevent further damage. Guildford Cathedral announced in February 2022 that it was considering a 'new interpretation' concerning Gill's statues of John the Baptist and of Christ on the Cross which are on their building. Several organisations, including Save the Children, resolved to stop using typefaces designed by Gill.

When, in 2017, the journalist Rachel Cooke contacted museums holding Gill's work to question what, if any, impact the abuse revelations had on their policy towards showing material by him, the majority refused to engage with her. An exception was the Ditchling Museum of Art + Craft in East Sussex, which holds many examples of Gill's work and also Gill family objects. In October 2016, the museum had held a workshop, Not Turning a Blind Eye, with artists, curators and journalists invited to discuss how to address Gill's behaviour in its exhibition programme. This resulted in a 2017 exhibition Eric Gill: The Body and a commitment by the museum to include at least one display highlighting Gill's offending in its permanent exhibitions. In 2022 The Observer reported that it appeared that the museum had decided to reduce the prominence given to Gill's work among its exhibits.

== Typefaces and inscriptions ==
In 1909, Gill carved Alphabets and Numerals for a book, Manuscript and Inscription Letters for Schools and Classes and for the Use of Craftsmen, compiled by Edward Johnston. He later gave them to the Victoria and Albert Museum so they could be used by students at the Royal College of Art. In 1914, Gill had met the typographer Stanley Morison, later a typographic consultant for the Monotype Corporation. Commissioned by Morison, he designed the Gill Sans typeface in 1927–30. Gill Sans was based on the sans-serif lettering originally designed for the London Underground. Gill had collaborated with Edward Johnston in the early design of the Underground typeface, but dropped out of the project before it was completed. In 1925, he designed the Perpetua typeface for Morison, with the uppercase based on monumental Roman inscriptions. An in-situ example of Gill's design and personal cutting in the style of Perpetua can be found in the nave of the church in Poling, West Sussex, on a wall plaque commemorating the life of Sir Harry Johnston. In the period 1930–31, Gill designed the typeface Joanna which he used to hand-set his book, An Essay on Typography.

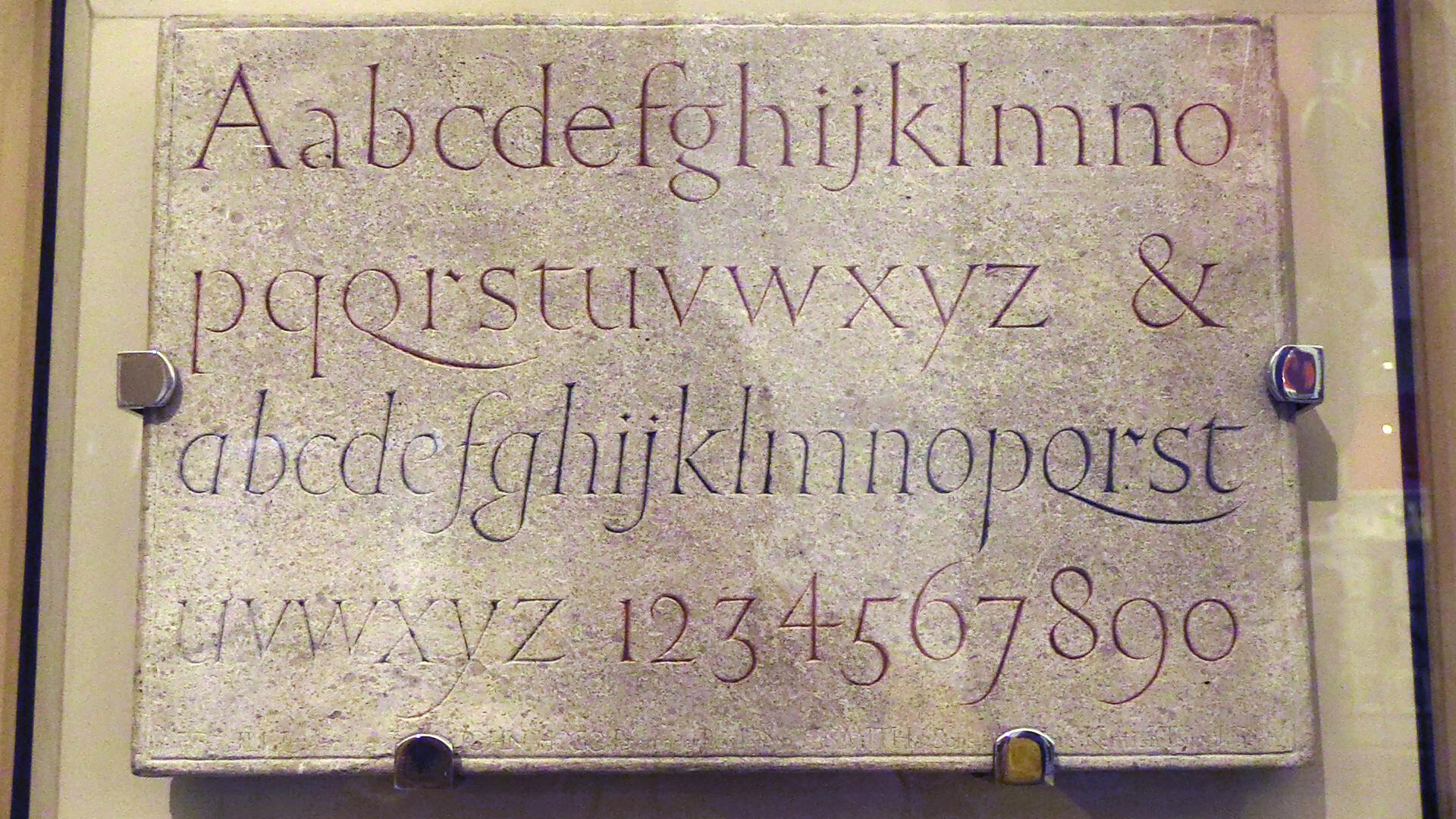
Alphabets and Numerals (1909)

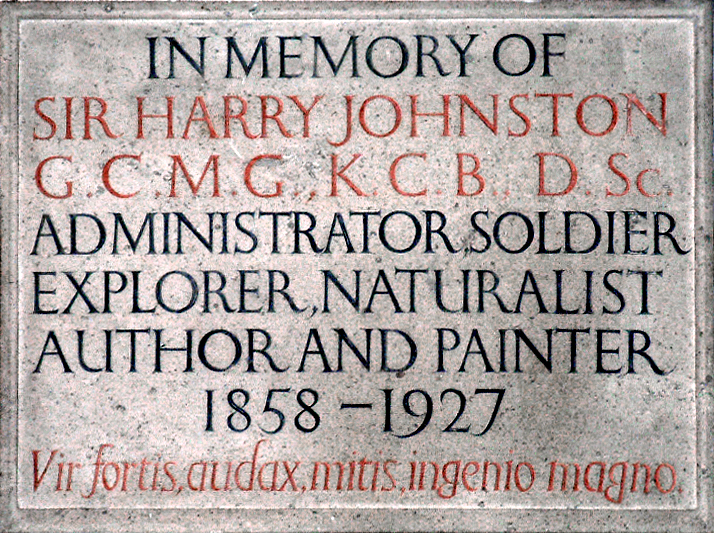
Sir Harry Johnston memorial plaque in the church at Poling, West Sussex

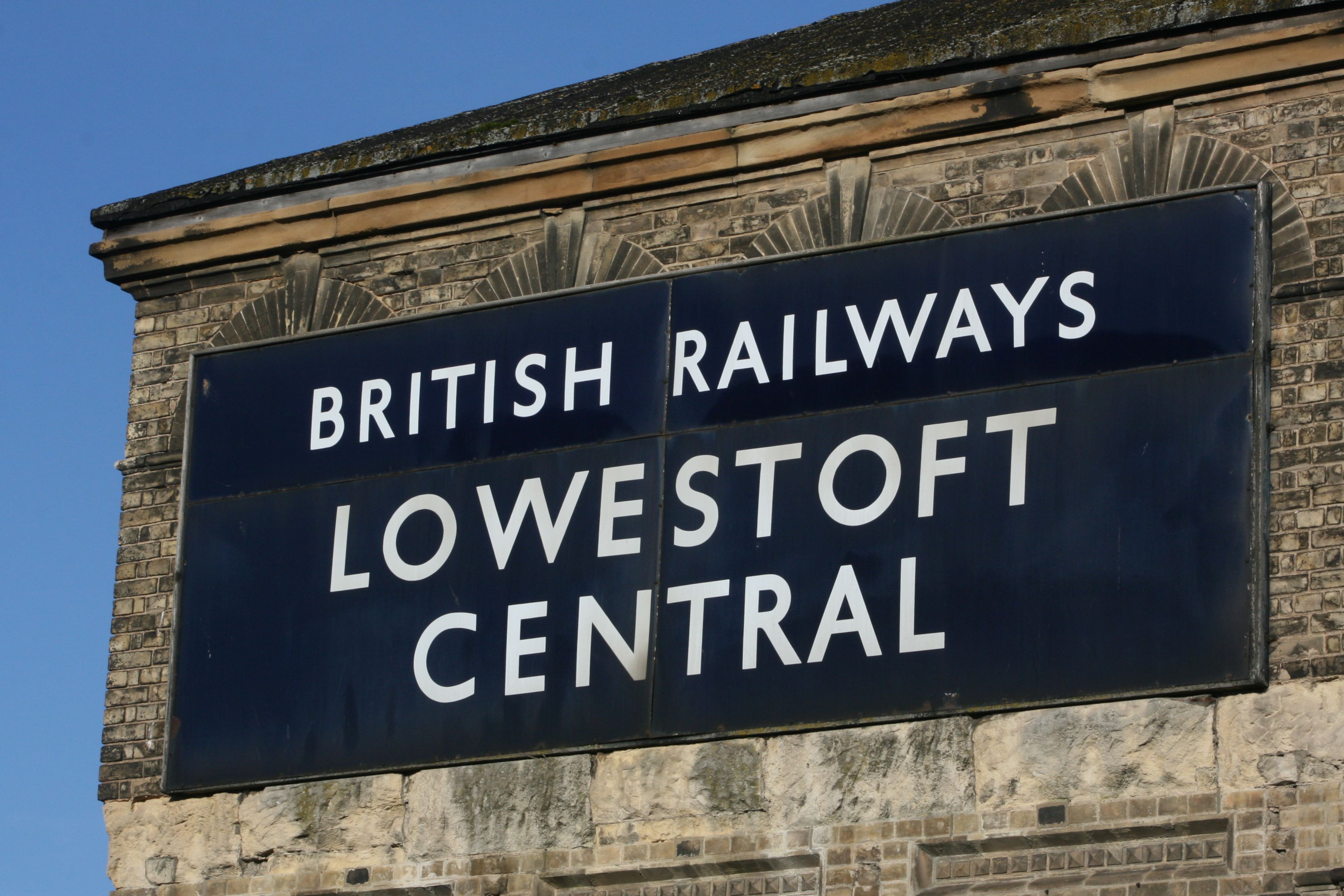
British Railways sign at Lowestoft railway station in Gill Sans

Gill's other types include:

- Golden Cockerel Press Type (for the Golden Cockerel Press; 1929) Designed bolder than some of Gill's other typefaces to provide a complement to wood engravings.
- Solus (1929)
- Aries (1932)
- Floriated Capitals (1932)
- Bunyan (1934)
- Pilgrim (recut version of Bunyan; 1953)
- Jubilee (also known as Cunard; 1934)

These dates are not precise, since a lengthy period could pass between Gill creating a design and it being finalised by the Monotype drawing office team (who would work out many details such as spacing) and cut into metal. In addition, some designs such as Joanna were released to fine printing use long before they became widely available from Monotype.

One of the most widely used British typefaces, Gill Sans, was used in the classic design system of Penguin Books and by the London and North Eastern Railway and later British Railways, with many additional styles created by Monotype both during and after Gill's lifetime. In the 1990s, the BBC adopted Gill Sans for its wordmark and many of its on-screen television graphics.

The family Gill Facia was created by Colin Banks as an emulation of Gill's stone carving designs, with separate styles for smaller and larger text.

Gill was commissioned to develop a typeface with the number of allographs limited to what could be used on Monotype systems or Linotype machines. The typeface was loosely based on the Arabic Naskh style but was considered unacceptably far from the norms of Arabic script. It was rejected and never cut into type.

== Published works ==
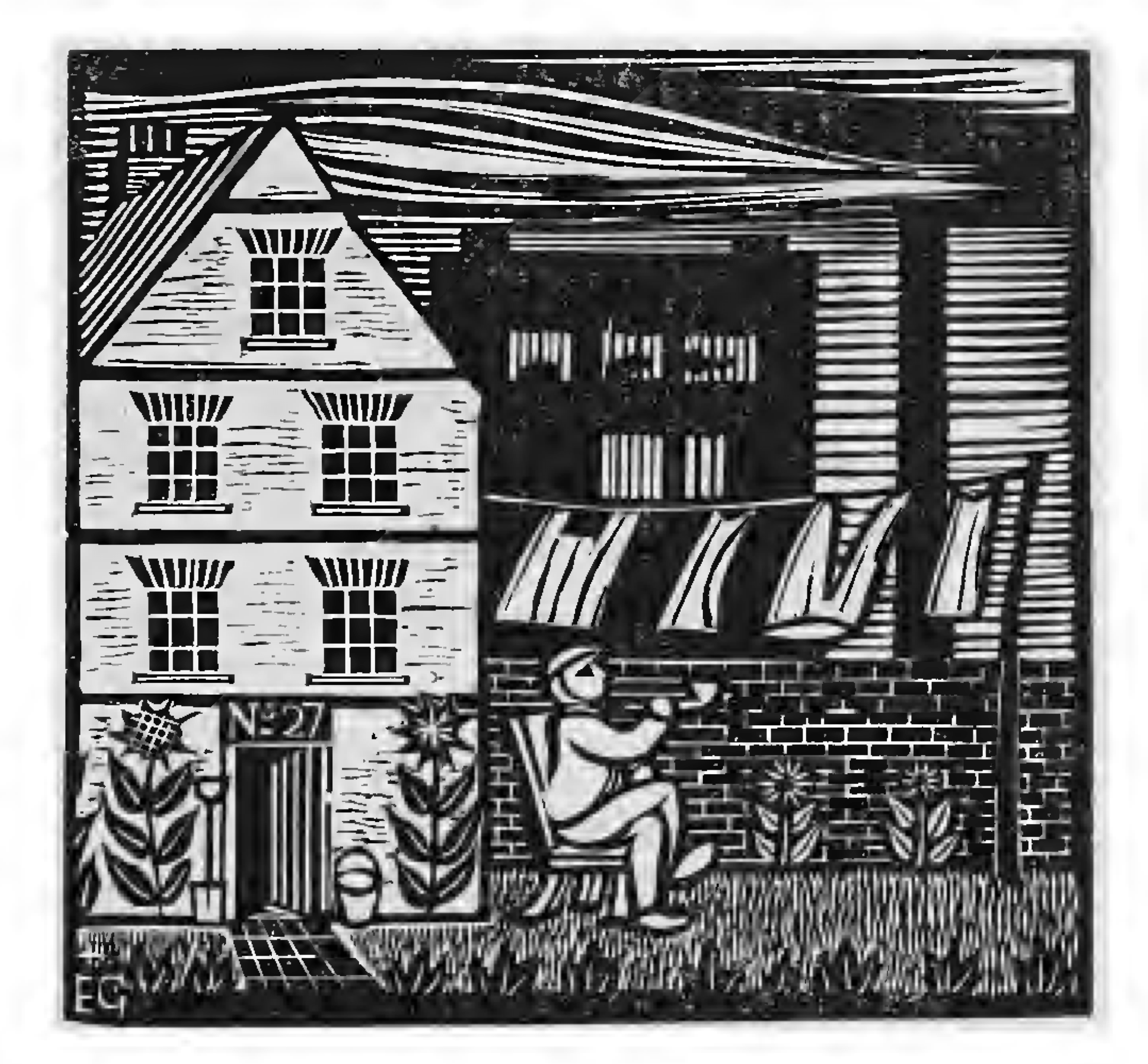
Illustration from the book The Devil's devices, or, Control versus Service by Hilary Pepler, 1915

Gill published numerous essays on the relationship between art and religion, and erotic engravings.

Gill's published writings include:

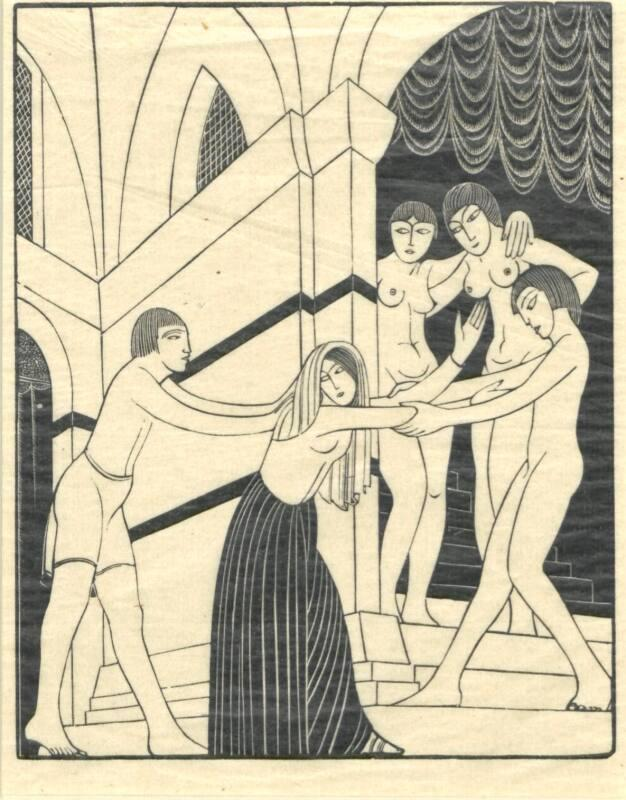
Songs of Solomon

- Christianity and Art, 1927
- Art-nonsense and other essays, Cassell 1929 (pocket edition 1934)
- Clothes: An Essay Upon the Nature and Significance of the Natural and Artificial Integuments Worn by Men and Women, 1931
- An Essay on Typography, 1931
- Beauty Looks After Herself, 1933
- Unemployment, 1933
- Money and Morals, 1934
- Art and a Changing Civilization, 1934
- Work and Leisure, 1935
- The Necessity of Belief, 1935
- Work and Property, 1937
- Work and Culture, Journal of the Royal Society of Arts, 1938
- Twenty-five nudes, 1938
- And Who Wants Peace?, 1938
- Sacred and Secular, 1940
- Autobiography: Quod Ore Sumpsimus
- Notes on Postage Stamps
- Christianity and the Machine Age, 1940.
- On the Birmingham School of Art, 1940
- Last Essays, 1943
- A Holy Tradition of Working: passages from the writings of Eric Gill 1983.

Gill provided woodcuts and illustrations for several books including:

- Gill, Eric (1925). Song of Songs. Waltham St. Lawrence, Berkshire: Golden Cockerel Press.
- The Four Gospels. Golden Cockerel Press. 1931. Facsimile edition published by Christopher Skelton at the September Press, Wellingborough, 1987.
- Chaucer, Geoffrey (1932). Troilus and Criseyde. Translated by Krapp, George Philip. New York: Literary Guild.
- Shakespeare, William (1939). Henry the Eighth. New York: Limited Editions Club.
- The Passion of Our Lord Jesus Christ, according to the four evangelists. Hague & Gill Printers. 1934, Faber & Faber
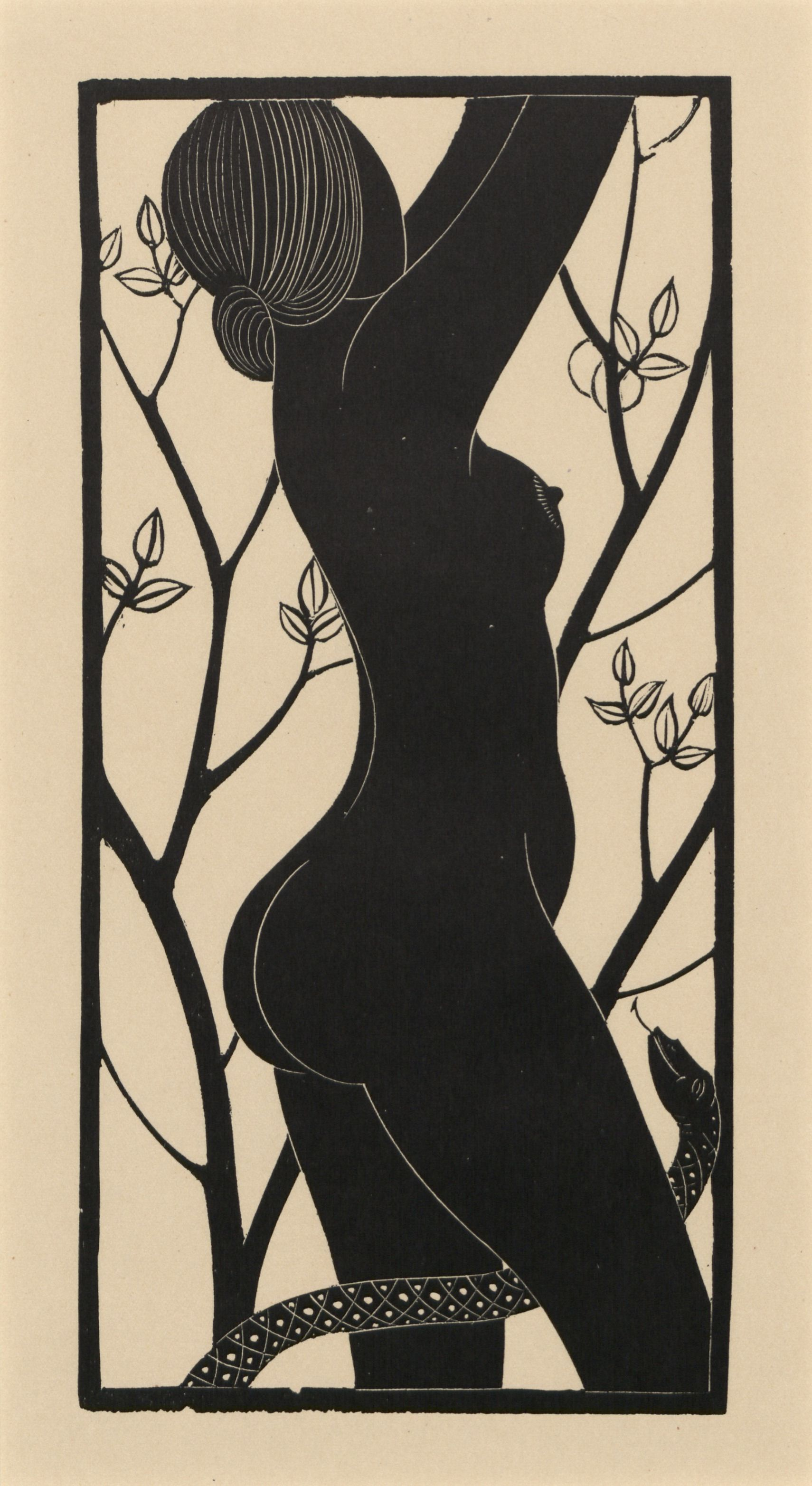
Eve, 1926

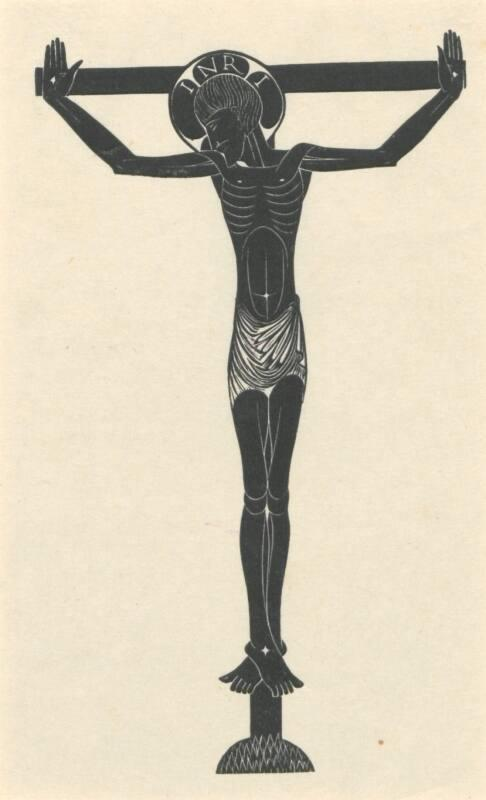
Christ on the Cross

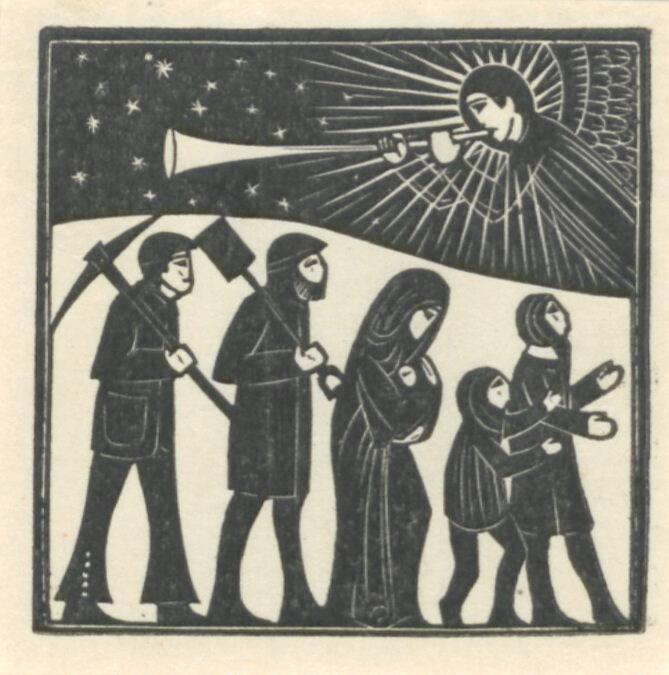
Angels Trumpet

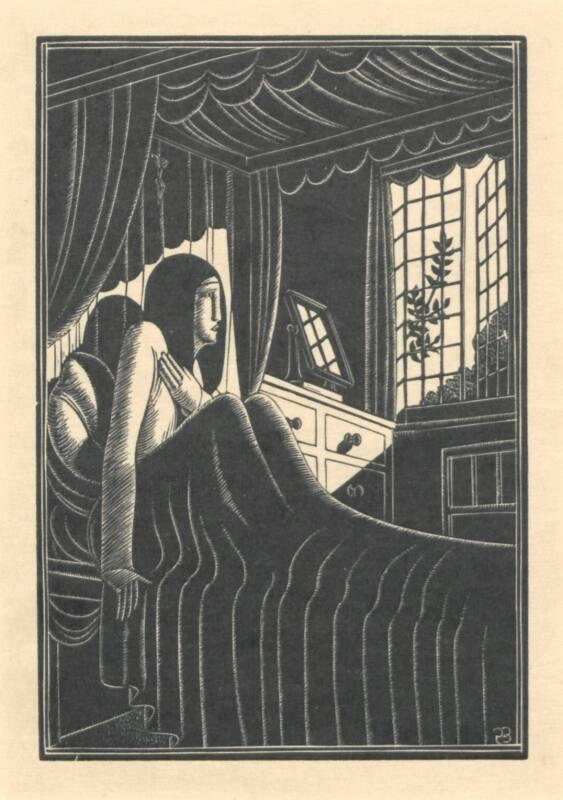
Autumn Midnight, c. 1923

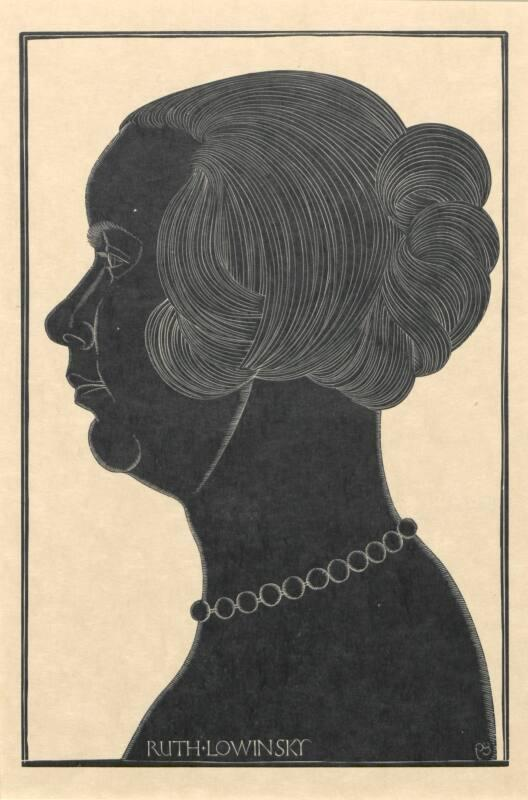
Mrs Ruth Lowinsky

== Archives ==
Gill's reference file of his engraved work, including impressions of almost all the engravings together with some related drawings, was donated to the Victoria and Albert Museum by his widow in 1952. The collection was supplemented by a later donation from Douglas Cleverdon. The collection formed the basis of a catalogue of Gill's engraved work prepared by John Physick and published in 1963.

Gill's papers and library are archived at the William Andrews Clark Memorial Library at UCLA in California, designated by the Gill family as the repository for his manuscripts and correspondence. Some of the books in his collection have been digitised as part of the Internet Archive. Additional archival and book collections related to Gill and his work reside at the University of Waterloo Library and the University of Notre Dame's Hesburgh Library. Much of Gill's work and memorabilia is held and is on display at the Ditchling Museum of Art + Craft.
