= Chirk War Memorial =

War memorial in Wales

Coordinates: 52.93251264056°N 3.0569893553674°W

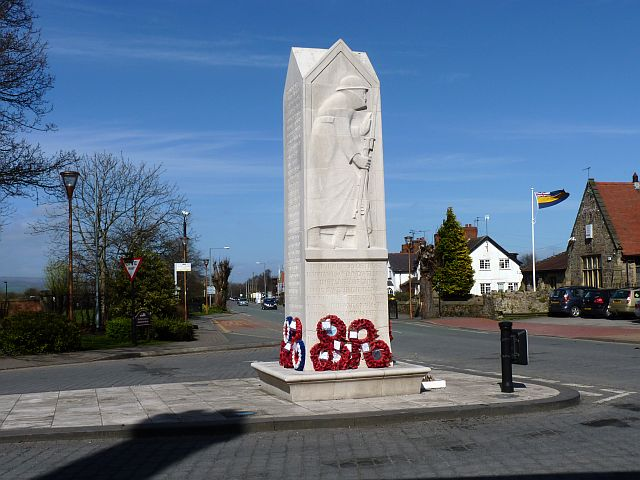
South face in 2011

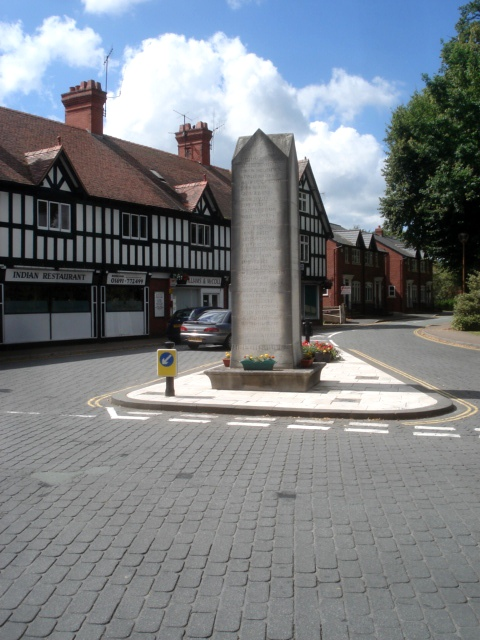
East face in 2007

Chirk War Memorial is a war memorial in the Welsh town of Chirk, now in Wrexham County Borough (until 1974, Chirk was in the historic county of Denbighshire and then in the county of Clwyd until 1996). The memorial stands on a traffic island at the east end of Station Avenue, at its junction Church Street. It became a Grade II* listed building in 1998.

It was commissioned as a First World War memorial by Thomas Scott-Ellis, 8th Baron Howard de Walden, tenant at Chirk Castle, and designed and made by the English sculptor Eric Gill. The memorial was unveiled in October 1920 by Lady Howard de Walden. A further inscription was added after the Second World War.

The memorial comprises a tapered square obelisk of Portland stone, standing on a low step which curves out to form a platform. The top of each face of the obelisk is carved into a pointed gable at 45-degree angles, with the ridges of the gables intersecting across the top of the memorial to create cross. The south face has a bas-relief carving of a soldier in profile facing east, in greatcoat and helmet, hunched forward over his rifle and bayonet, above the main inscription which reads: "TO THE MEMORY OF THOSE / HABITANTS AND INDWELLERS / OF THE PARISH OF CHIRK / WHO GAVE UP THEIR LIVES / FOR THE CAUSE of THEIR COUNTRY / DURING THE GREAT WAR OF 1914-1919 / THIS MONUMENT WAS ESTABLI-/SHED BY THEIR FELLOWS / OF THE PARISH / IN RIGHTEOUSNESS".

The west and east faces are inscribed with the names of the 66 fallen men of the parish, with 33 forenames and surnames on each side. The Anglican parish church of St Mary nearby also houses a Roll of Honour.

The north side bears the inscription in Welsh: "ER / ARDDERCHOG / GOFFA / AM / WYRYWAEN / A ROES EU HEINIOES / YN ACHOS EU GWLAD / YN Y RHYFEL MAWR / 1914-1919 / Y GOSODWYD / Y MAEN HWN / GAN EU / CYD BLWYFOLION" ("In / glorious / commemoration / of / the men of Chirk / who gave their lives / in the cause of their country / in the Great War / 1914-1919 / this stone / was erected / by their / fellow parishioners"). Below this, after the Second World, was added "1939-1945/ IN LOVING MEMORY OF" and another 19 names.

Around the base of the obelisk, below the main inscriptions, is a further inscription from the Book of Revelation, chapter 19, verse 11, in larger type, starting at the west face and ending on the north face: "AND / IN RIGHTEOUNESS / HE DOTH JUDGE & / MAKE WAR. REV.XIX""

== See also ==
- Grade II* listed buildings in Wrexham County Borough
