= List of type designers =

A type designer is a person who designs typefaces. (The term "typographer" is sometimes misapplied to type designers: a typographer is a person who arranges existing typefaces to lay out a page – see typography.)

A partial list of notable type designers follows by country, with a signature typeface (or two for significant designers).

== Australia ==
- Stephen Banham

== Brazil ==
- Eduardo Recife

== Canada ==
- Gerald Giampa
- Ray Larabie
- Jim Rimmer
- Nick Shinn
- Sara Soskolne (Gotham with Jonathan Hoefler and Tobias Frere-Jones)

== Czech Republic ==
- Vojtěch Preissig
- František Štorm

== France ==
- George Auriol (Auriol)
- Michel Bouvet
- Louis Braille
- Adolphe Mouron Cassandre (Peignot, 1937)
- Charles Nicolas Cochin
- Simon de Colines
- Firmin Didot
- François Didot
- François-Ambroise Didot
- Henri Didot
- Pierre Didot
- Roger Excoffon
- Pierre Simon Fournier
- Claude Garamond (Garamond)
- Robert Granjon
- Hector Guimard
- Nicolas Jenson
- Christophe Plantin
- Jean-François Porchez
- Jacques Sabon
- Wynkyn de Worde

== Germany ==
- Otto Arpke (Taiko)
- Johann Christian Bauer (Fette Fraktur)
- Konrad Friedrich Bauer (Fortune)
- Walter Baum (Fortune)
- Peter Behrens (Bahrens-Schrift)
- Georg Belwe (Belwe Roman)
- Lucian Bernhard (Bernhard Gothic)
- Jakob Erbar (Erbar, Candida, Feder Grotesk, Koloss)
- Johann Gutenberg
- Karlgeorg Hoefer (Elegance, Permanent)
- Heinrich Jost (Bauer Bodoni, Beton)
- Rudolf Koch (Kabel, Neuland, Wilhelm Klingspor Gotisch)
- Paul Renner (Futura, 1927)
- Erik Spiekermann (FF Meta, ITC Officina, FF Info, FF Unit and others)
- Jan Tschichold (Sabon)
- Carlos Winkow designer for the Nacional Typefoundry of Madrid
- Berthold Wolpe (Albertus)
- Hermann Zapf (Palatino, Optima, Zapf Chancery, Zapf Dingbats, Zapfino)
- Gudrun Zapf von Hesse (Diotima, Alcuin)

== Israel ==
- Henri Friedlaender (Hadassah, Shalom, Hadar, Aviv)
- Eliyahu Koren (Koren)

== Italy ==
- Amoretti Brothers (Amoretti)
- Raffaello Bertieri (Inkunabula, Paganini)
- Giambattista Bodoni (Bodoni)
- Alessandro Butti (Microgramma, Rondine)
- Francesco Griffo (Bembo, Poliphilus)
- Aldus Manutius
- Aldo Novarese (Novarese, Eurostile, Fenice, Recta, Microgramma, Stop, Expert, Magister, Garaldus, Normandia, Recta, Estro)
- Fabrizio Schiavi (PragmataPro, Sys, Abitare Sans, Siruca)

== Netherlands ==
- Evert Bloemsma (FF Balance, FF Cocon, FF Avance, FF Legato)
- Jos Buivenga (Anivers, Calluna, Delicious, Diavlo, Fontin, Fertigo, Museo, Questa)
- Wim Crouwel (Catalogue, Fodor, Gridnik, New Alphabet, Stedelijk)
- Bram de Does (TEFF Trinité, TEFF Lexicon)
- Dick Dooijes (Nobel, Contura, Lectura, Rondo, Mercator)
- Lucas de Groot (Thesis, TheAntiqua, Corpid, Calibri)
- Boudewijn Ietswaart (Balduina)
- Jan van Krimpen (Spectrum, Romanée, Romulus, Haarlemmer, Lutetia, Cancellaresca Bastarda)
- Martin Majoor (FF Scala, FF Scala Sans, Telefont, FF Seria, FF Seria Sans, FF Nexus Serif, FF Nexus Sans, FF Nexus Mix)
- Gerrit Noordzij (TEFF Burgundica, TEFF Ruse)
- Albert-Jan Pool (FF DIN, URW Imperial, URW Linear, Mauritius I, FF OCR-F, Jet Set Sans, DTL HEIN GAS, Regenbogen Bold)
- S.H. de Roos (aka Sjoerd de Roos (Hollandsche Mediæval, Grotius, Egmont, Libria, De Roos, Zilvertype)
- Fred Smeijers (OurType, Arnhem, Fresco, Sansa, DTL Nobel, TEFF Renard, FF Quadraat)
- Gerard Unger (Allianz, Amerigo, ANWB fonts, DTL Argo, Big Vesta, Capitoleum, Capitoleum News, Coranto, Decoder, Delftse Poort, Demos, Flora, Gulliver, Hollander, Markeur, M.O.L., Oranda, DTL Paradox, Praxis, Swift, Swift 2.0, Vesta)

== New Zealand ==
- Joseph Churchward
- Kris Sowersby
- Jack Yan

== Portugal ==
- Manuel Pereira da Silva (MPS Rotunda) (deceased)

== Russia ==
- Alexandra Korolkova (PT Fonts)
- Solomon Telingater (1903–1969)

== Serbia ==
- Hieromonk Makarije

== Slovakia ==
- Peter Biľak (Eureka, Fedra, Greta, History, Irma, Julien, Karloff, Lava)
- Zuzana Licko (Mrs Eaves, Filosofia)

== Spain ==
- Eudald Pradell, punchcutter

== Sweden ==
- Bo Berndal (Sispos and Sisneg; Old Swedish standard [SIS 030011, 1973] for public road signs, displays)
- Karl-Erik Forsberg (Berling, Lunda, Carolus, Ericus, Gustavus, Polhem, Carolina Script, Aros Antiqua)
- Akke Kumlien (Kumlien Medieval)
- Franko Luin

== Switzerland ==
- Max Bill (Bill)
- Adrian Frutiger (1928–2015, Avenir, Frutiger, Univers)
- Karl Gerstner
- Max Miedinger (Helvetica)

== Syria ==
- Mamoun Sakkal (Shilia, Hasan Al Quds, Al-Futtaim)

== Thailand ==
- Anuthin Wongsunkakon

== United Kingdom ==
- Charles Robert Ashbee (Endevour, Prayer Book)
- Richard Austin (Bel, Porson)
- Jonathan Barnbrook (Mason, Exocet, 1996 released through Emigre fonts, Nylon, Prototype, Bastarda)
- Paul Barnes (Guardian Egyptian, with Christian Schwartz, 2005)
- John Baskerville (Baskerville)
- Robert Besley (Clarendon)
- Neville Brody (Arcadia, 1986, Blur, Auto-Suggestion)
- Margaret Calvert (Transport, Rail Alphabet)
- Matthew Carter (Snell Roundhand, 1965; Shelley Script, 1972; Galliard, 1978; Skia, Georgia, Mantinia, all 1993; Verdana, 1996; Tahoma, 1999)
- William Caslon (Caslon)
- Roy Cole (Lina, 2004)
- Eric Gill (Gill Sans, Perpetua, both 1928; Joanna, 1937)
- Phill Grimshaw (over 44 typefaces including Oberon, Hazel, Gravura, Obelisk, Klepto)
- Robert Harling
- Rian Hughes (Blackcurrant, Custard and numerous others released through Device)
- Edward Johnston (Johnston, 1916)
- Seb Lester (Scene, Soho, Neo Sans and Neo Tech)
- Bruno Maag (Tesco, Tottenham Hotspur, Telewest, Urban Splash, BT, BMW, Vodafone, Nokia Pure) Dalton Maag Type Design
- Stanley Morison (Times New Roman)
- Fiona Ross (Adobe Devanagari, Linotype Devanagari, Adobe Thai)
- Jeremy Tankard (Bliss, Corbel, Blue Island, Disturbance, Enigma, Aspect)
- Walter Tracy (Jubilee, Adsans, Telegraph Modern, 1969 Times Europa, 1972)

== United States ==
- Ed Benguiat (over 600 typefaces including Bookman, and ITC Benguiat)
- Linn Boyd Benton (Century)
- Morris Fuller Benton (America's most prolific type designer, having completed 221 total typefaces, including Franklin Gothic, Century Schoolbook, News Gothic, Bank Gothic)
- Lucian Bernhard (Bernhard Gothic, Bernhard Modern)
- Charles Bigelow and Kris Holmes, partners in design (Lucida family)
- Joseph Blumenthal (Spiral, Emerson)
- William H. Bradley
- Jackson Burke (Trade Gothic, 1948)
- Leslie Cabarga (Magneto, Bad Typ, Casey, Streamline, Raceway)
- Warren Chappell (Lydian series)
- Thomas Maitland Cleland (Della Robbia)
- Vincent Connare (Comic Sans, Trebuchet, Magpie)
- Oswald Bruce 'Oz' Cooper (Cooper Black, 1921)
- Rick Cusick (Nyx)
- Joshua Darden (Freight, Omnes)
- Chank Diesel
- Michael Doret (Metroscript, Deliscript, DeLuxe Gothic, Orion MD, PowerStation)
- William Addison Dwiggins (36 completed typefaces including Electra, Caledonia, Metro)
- Louise Fili (Mardell, Montecatini)
- Tobias Frere-Jones (Interstate, Gotham, Reactor, Mallory, Retina)
- Sidney Gaunt (46 typefaces including Adstyle, Pencraft)
- Ross F. George (sign painter and type designer)
- William S. Gillies (Gillies Light, Gillies Bold)
- Bertram Goodhue (Cheltenham)
- Frederic Goudy (90 completed typefaces including Copperplate, 1905; Goudy Old Style, 1915; Berkeley Oldstyle, 1938)
- Chauncey H. Griffith (34 typefaces including Bell Gothic, 1937; Poster Bodoni, 1938)
- Victor Hammer (American Uncial)
- Sol Hess (house designer for Lanston Monotype Company, where he completed 85 typefaces)
- Jessica Hische (Brioche, Tilda, Buttermilk)
- Jonathan Hoefler (Knockout, Gotham, Sentinel, Mercury, Chronicle, Archer, Verlag, Forza, Hoefler Text, Hoefler Titling, Ideal Sans)
- Kris Holmes (Lucida)
- Dard Hunter (private faces for his Mountain House Press)
- Susan Kare (original Apple Macintosh typeface, 1984)
- Richard Kegler
- Donald Knuth (Computer Modern)
- Raph Levien (Inconsolata, Museum, Century Catalogue)
- Zuzana Licko (Filosofia, Triplex, Mrs Eaves)
- Harold Lohner
- Herb Lubalin (ITC Avant Garde, Lubalin Graph)
- Steve Matteson (Aptos, Curlz, Droid, Open Sans)
- Douglas Crawford McMurtrie (Ultra-Modern Roman)
- R. Hunter Middleton (99 typefaces including:Stellar, Coronet, Stencil, Delphian, Umbra)
- James Montalbano (Clearview)
- Berne Nadall (1869–1932), Caslon Antique.
- Lawrence O'Donnell (Seglimint, 2006)
- William Dana Orcutt (Humanistic)
- Wadsworth A. Parker (Lexington, Gallia)
- Jim Parkinson (ITC Bodoni [with Janice Prescott Fishman, Holly Goldsmith, and Sumner Stone], Jimbo, Sutro)
- Joseph W. Phinney (Abbott Old Style, Cloister Black [with M.F. Benton], Camelot [with F. Goudy])
- Will Ransom (Parsons)
- Thomas Rickner
- Bruce Rogers (Centaur)
- Rudolph Ruzicka (Fairfield)
- Christian Schwartz (Neutraface, Neue Haas Grotesk, Amplitude, Guardian Egyptian)
- Tré Seals (VTC Martin, Bayard, Carrie)
- Ralph Fletcher Seymour (private typefaces for his Alderbrink Press)
- Mark Simonson
- Robert Slimbach (Minion, Adobe Garamond, Utopia, Garamond Premier)
- Sumner Stone (Stone Sans, Stone Serif, Stone Informal, Stone Print, Cycles)
- Tommy Thompson (titling series for Saturday Evening Post and Colliers)
- Carol Twombly (Lithos, Myriad (co-designer), Trajan, Charlemagne, Nueva, Adobe Caslon)
- Frederic Warde (Arrighi)
- Robert Wiebking (31 typefaces as a designer, including Artcraft, Munder, Advertisers Gothic; many more as a punch-cutter)
- Doyald Young (Young Baroque, Eclat)
