= Font superfamily =

Group of typefaces

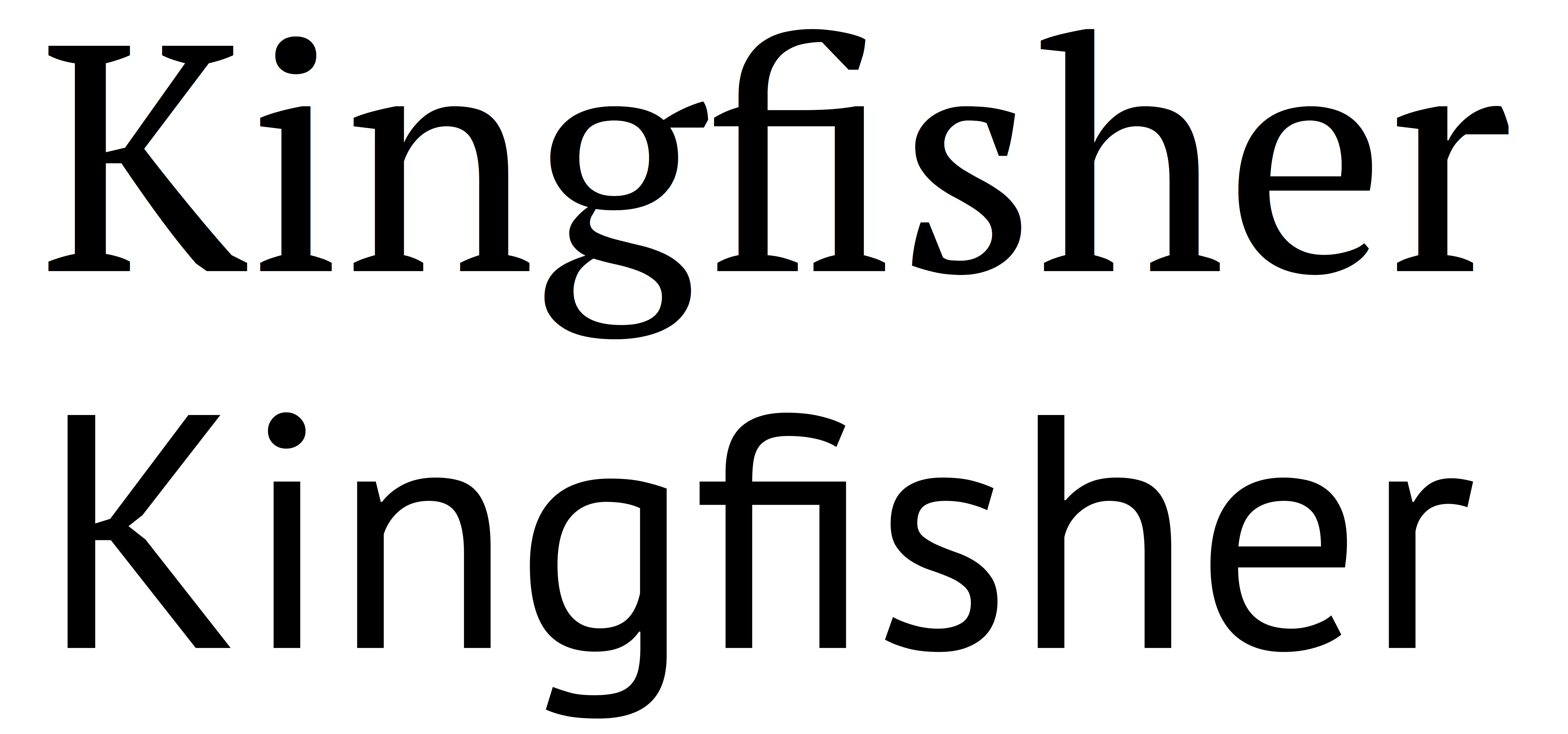
The PT family, showing the related structures of letters

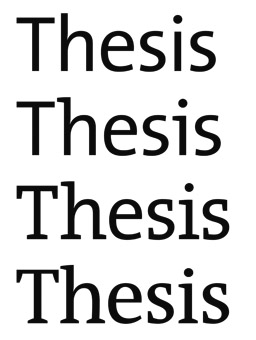
Thesis by Lucas DeGroot

In typography, a font superfamily, or typeface superfamily, is a collection of font families that fall into multiple classifications, typically covering serif, sans-serif, and monospaced typefaces.

Some font superfamilies are created to have similar letterforms. The norm is to start from an identical character shape and then add class-specific features such as serifs or slab serifs.

Other superfamilies are grouped together for a common purpose that are not exactly complementary in letterform structure. For instance, Noto fonts and GNU FreeFont are both created to cover characters in as many languages as possible, given the resource of their respective designer teams. The TeX Gyre fonts were created for the TeX community, although they are now widely used in other environments.

Superfamilies can allow organisations to expand their image and style while maintaining stylistic consistency. For example, BBC Reith font superfamily was commissioned by the BBC in 2018 to facilitate 'typographic expression' and consists of three styles (condensed, sans, serif) as well as a multitude of weights.

== Notable superfamilies ==
=== Same letterforms ===
Berlingske
by Playtype, comprising Berlingske Serif, Berlingske Serif Display, Berlingske Serif Stencil, Berlingske sans, Berlingske Sans Display, Berlingske sans Stencil, Berlingske Slab, Berlingske Slab Display, Berlingske Slab Stencil, Berlingske Typewrite.
FF Meta
by Erik Spiekermann, comprising FF Meta (sans), FF Meta Serif and FF Meta Headline
FF Nexus
by Martin Majoor, comprising FF Nexus Sans, FF Nexus Serif, FF Nexus Mix and FF Nexus Typewriter
FF Quadraat
by Fred Smeijers, comprising FF Quadraat (serif), FF Quadraat Sans, FF Quadraat Display and FF Quadraat Headliner
FF Scala
by Martin Majoor, comprising FF Scala (serif) and FF Scala Sans
FF Seria
by Martin Majoor, comprising FF Seria (serif) and FF Seria Sans
Generis
by Erik Faulhaber, comprising Generis Sans, Generis Serif, Generis Simple and Generis Slab
ITC Humana
by Timothy Donaldso, comprising ITC Humana Sans, ITC Humana Serif and ITC Humana Script
ITC Officina
by Erik Spiekermann and Just van Rossum, comprising ITC Officina Sans, ITC Officina Serif and ITC Officina Display
Linotype Authentic
by Karin Huschka, comprising Linotype Authentic Sans, Linotype Authentic Serif, Linotype Authentic Small Serif and Linotype Authentic Stencil
Linotype Compatil
by Olaf Leu, comprising Compatil Text, Compatil Fact, Compatil Letter and Compatil Exquisit
Lucida
by Charles Bigelow and Kris Holmes, comprising Lucida Sans, Lucida Serif, Lucida Typewriter Sans, Lucida Typewriter Serif and Lucida Math
Merriweather
by Eben Sorkin, comprising Merriweather and Merriweather Sans
Penumbra
by Lance Hidy, comprising Penumbra Sans, Penumbra Serif, Penumbra Half Serif and Penumbra Flare
PT Fonts
by Alexandra Korolkova et al, comprising PT Serif, PT Sans and PT Mono.
Rotis
by Otl Aicher, comprising rotis serif, rotis semi-serif, rotis semi-sans and rotis sans
Sassoon
by Rosemary Sassoon and Adrian William, comprising Sassoon Sans, Sassoon Book, Sassoon Primary, Sassoon Infant and Sassoon Sans Slope
Source
by Paul D. Hunt and Frank Grießhammer, comprising Source Sans Pro, Source Serif Pro and Source Code Pro
Stone
by Sumner Stone, comprising Stone Serif, Stone Sans and Stone Informal
Thesis
by Lucas de Groot, comprising TheSans, TheSerif, TheMix and TheAntiqua
Trajan
both Trajan (serif, designed by Carol Twombly) and Trajan Sans. No lower-case.

=== Same purpose ===
Consisted mostly of open-source fonts, the superfamilies listed below are developed for computer systems or typesetting environments to support letter forms without the need for commercial licenses.

Computer Modern
by Donald E. Knuth, comprising CMR (antiqua), CMSS (grotesque) and CMTT (monospaced)
DejaVu and Bitstream Vera
comprising DejaVu Sans, DejaVu Sans Mono and DejaVu Serif.
Droid
by Steve Matteson, comprising Droid Sans, Droid Serif and Droid Sans Mono.
IBM Plex
by Mike Abbink, comprising IBM Plex Sans, IBM Plex Sans Condensed, IBM Plex Serif and IBM Plex Mono
Noto fonts
by Google, comprising Noto Sans, Noto Serif and Noto Mono, an expansion of the Droid family. It supports a wide range of languages.
Roboto
by Christian Robertson, comprising Roboto, Roboto Slab, Roboto Serif, Roboto Flex, Roboto Mono
Liberation
by Steve Matteson, comprising Liberation Sans, Liberation Serif and Liberation Mono
GNU FreeFont
comprising FreeSerif, FreeSans, and FreeMono, which are open-source clones of Times, Helvetica, and Courier
TeX Gyre fonts
clones of popular commercial fonts developed for TeX environments
