= Solus (typeface) =

Serif typeface designed by Eric Gill

Eric Gill's artwork for the capitals of Solus, showing an alternative 'M' at bottom right similar to that of Gill Sans.

Solus is a serif typeface that was designed by English sculptor and stonemason Eric Gill for the British Monotype Corporation and released in 1929.

Solus has a structure of straight, regular serifs reminiscent of slab-serif typefaces of the nineteenth century, but with a reduced build giving an impression of crispness. Along with these characteristics, Solus bears the distinct personality of Gill's characteristic preferences in letterforms, such as the pointed end to the top left of the letter 'a'. James Mosley describes Solus as "essentially a mechanistic type — a ‘light Egyptian’", a conclusion also reached by editor Robert Harling in his book on Gill's work. (Note: Walter Tracy in contrast commented: "it is hard to accept the suggestion that the egyptian form was in Eric Gill's mind...[Solus] is really no more than a Perpetua-like roman unhappily fitted with a thickened version of the serifs of Monotype Bodoni 135, recommended to Gill by Stanley Morison.")

Solus was not particularly popular during the metal type period, which Harling suggests was because it was too similar to Gill's pre-existing Perpetua, not having an italic and having little appeal in display use, unlike more aggressive slab serif designs. Gill's Joanna, designed some years later in a similar style but with an italic, has become much more popular.

Solus has not been digitised by Monotype; an unofficial revival has been made by the company K-Type. Financier, by Kris Sowersby, is a respected revival loosely influenced by Solus, Perpetua and Joanna. Its optical size designed for small-size text is influenced by Solus and Joanna more while its display size more recalls Perpetua.
