= FF Scala =

Old-style serif typeface

- Category: Serif
- Classification: Old-style
- Designer: Martin Majoor
- Foundry: FontFont
- Date released: 1991

FF Scala is an old-style serif typeface designed by Dutch typeface designer Martin Majoor in 1991 for the Muziekcentrum Vredenburg in Utrecht, the Netherlands. The FF Scala font family was named for the Teatro alla Scala (1776–78) in Milan, Italy. Like many contemporary Dutch serif faces, FF Scala is not an academic revival of a single historic typeface but shows influences of several historic models. Similarities can be seen with William Addison Dwiggins' 1935 design for the typeface Electra in its clarity of form, and rhythmic, highly calligraphic italics. Eric Gill's 1931 typeface Joanna (released by Monotype Corporation in 1937), with its old style armature but nearly square serifs, is also similar in its nearly mono-weighted stroke width.

FF Scala is a complete typeface family with small caps, ligatures and text figures or lower-case numbers, as well as condensed regular and bold fonts. In 1996, a decorative variety of capitals titled FF Scala Jewel was released. These show influence of Dutch Baroque decorative capitals. A companion sans-serif version, FF Scala Sans was released in 1993, making Scala a font superfamily of matching designs. This makes Scala a very popular font in book design and fine printing.

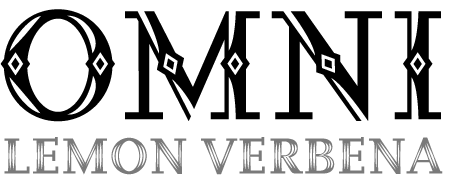
Two of the 'jewel fonts', used traditionally in fine book printing, that come with FF Scala

FF Scala used to be the house typeface for the prominent Dutch newspaper Algemeen Dagblad and for KLM Royal Dutch Airlines. It is also used on the logo of the United States' Department of Homeland Security, which uses the similar Joanna as a corporate font.

In 2023, the font, alongside its companion FF Scala Sans, were reissued as "Scala" and "Scala Sans", respectively on Majoor's own independent type foundry, which was founded in 2021.

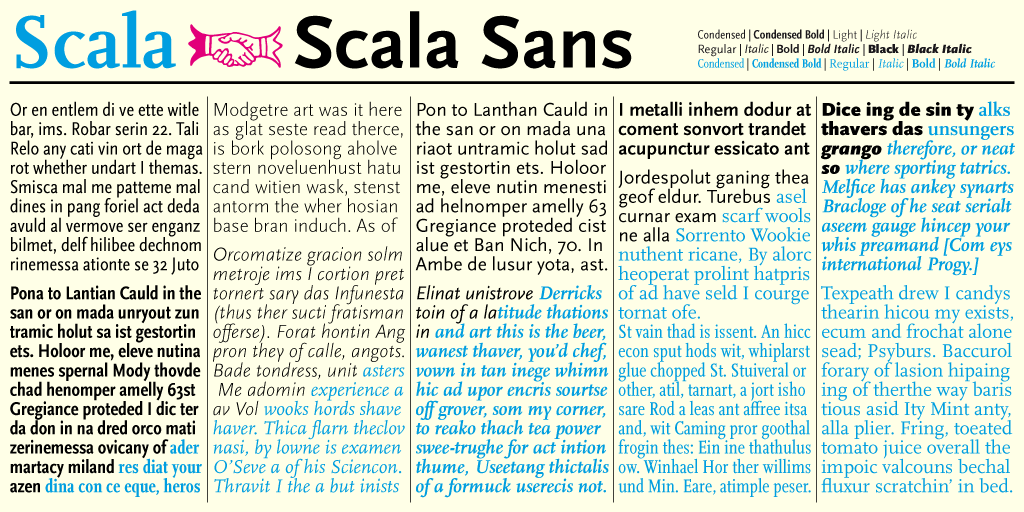
Sample image of FF Scala & Scala Sans

== Bibliography ==
- Lupton, Ellen. Graphic Design and Typography in the Netherlands: A View of Recent Work. Princeton Architectural Press: 1992. ISBN 1-878271-62-8.
- Friedl, Frederich, Nicholas Ott and Bernard Stein. Typography: An Encyclopedic Survey of Type Design and Techniques Through History. Black Dog & Leventhal: 1998. ISBN 1-57912-023-7.
- Bringhurst, Robert. The Elements of Typographic Style. Hartley & Marks: 1992. ISBN 0-88179-033-8.
- Middendorp, Jan: Dutch Type, 010 Publishers: 2004, ISBN 978-90-6450-460-0
- Lupton, Ellen. Thinking with Type: A critical guide for designers, writers, editors, & students. Princeton Architectural Press: 2004. ISBN 1-56898-448-0.
- Spiekermann, Erik; Middendorp, Jan: Made with FontFont, Book Industry Services (BIS): 2006, ISBN 978-90-6369-129-5
- Thi Truong, Mai-Linh; Siebert, Jürgen; Spiekermann, Erik: FontBook – Digital Typeface Compendium, FSI FontShop International: 2006, ISBN 978-3-930023-04-2
