= Hartley & Marks Publishers =

Hartley & Marks Publishers is a Vancouver, British Columbia-based publishing company that began as a publisher of books on a diverse range of esoteric subjects. Many of the company's early books concerned health and medicine and an interest in Eastern culture. One of its more notable books is The Elements of Typographic Style by Robert Bringhurst, which has been highly praised by many luminaries in the typographic field, such as Hermann Zapf, who said "I wish to see this book become the Typographers’ Bible," and Jonathan Hoefler and Tobias Frere-Jones, who consider it "the finest book ever written about typography."

Hartley & Marks Publishers now specializes in a line of journals or "blank books", Paperblanks, whose cover designs are integrated from artwork collected from major libraries and museums around the world. The influence for these designs range from "traditional Asian art and renaissance aesthetics to the art deco stylings of Louis Tiffany."
