= ArtEZ University of the Arts =

Art school in the Netherlands

- ArtEZ hogeschool voor de kunsten
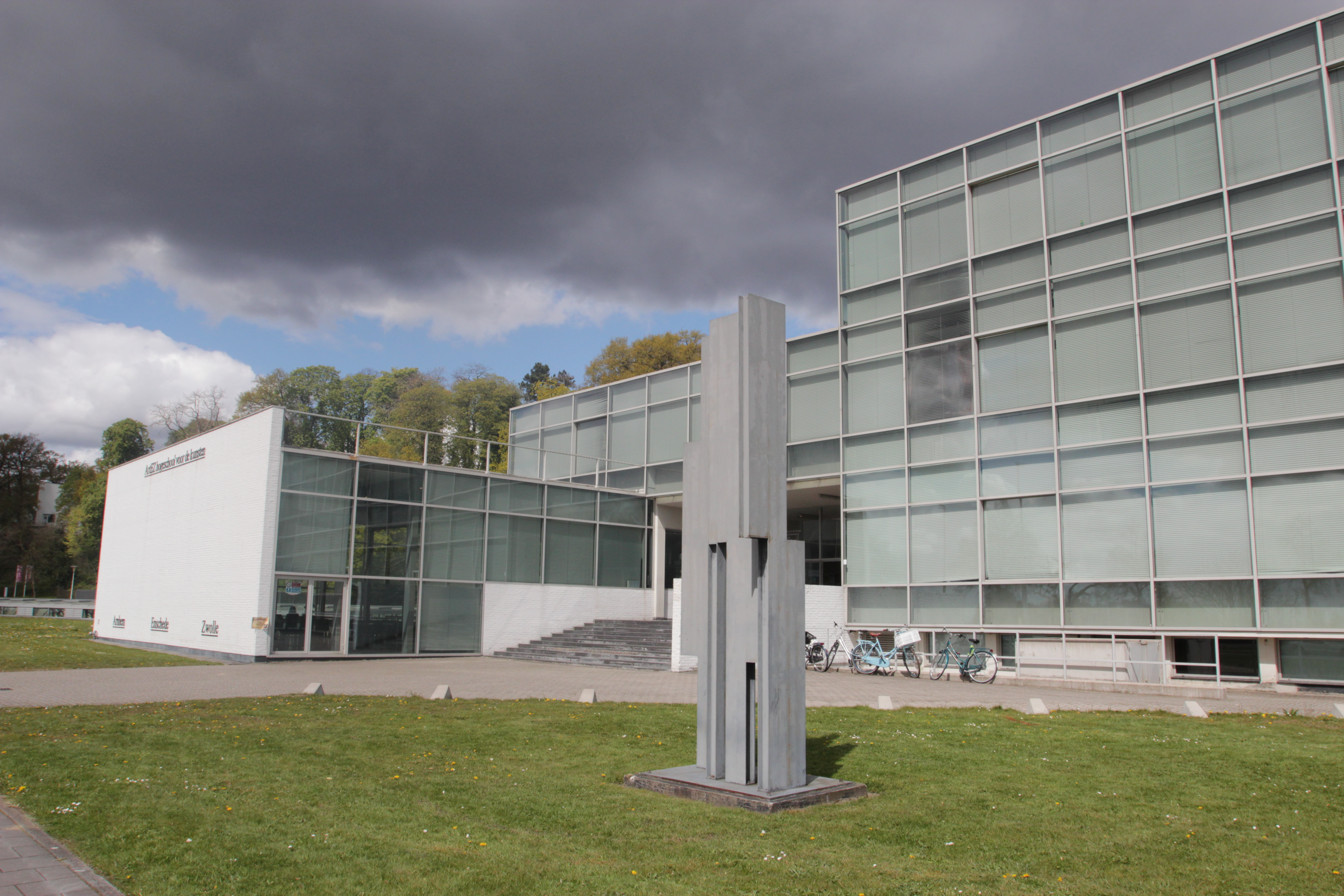
- A photo of the ArtEZ Arnhem campus, designed by Gerrit Rietveld.
- Type: Private art academy
- Established: 2002
- Accreditation: NVAO
- Total staff: ± 1000
- Students: ± 3000
- Location: Arnhem, Enschede and Zwolle, Netherlands; 51°59′1.9″N 5°53′40.7″E
- Language: Dutch, English
- Colours: Black and aqua
- Website: artez.nl

ArtEZ University of the Arts (Dutch: ArtEZ hogeschool voor de kunsten) is an art academy in the Netherlands. ArtEZ combines several art institutes and art disciplines with branches in Arnhem, Enschede, and Zwolle. In its name the A stands for Arnhem, the E for Enschede, and Z for Zwolle.

== Academies ==
ArtEZ has divisions in the following subjects in the following locations:

- Arnhem: Fashion design, graphic design, product design, fine art, music, creative writing, dance, theatre, architecture, interior design, education in art, interaction design
- Enschede has two locations:
  - The AKI Academy for Art & Design: Graphic design, fine art, and moving image
  - The conservatory: Music and education in art
- Zwolle: Animation, Comic Design, Graphic design, music, architecture, interior, education in art

== Notable teachers and alumni ==
- Yaquelin Abdala (painter)
- Simone Atangana Bekono (writer)
- Michiel Braam (jazz pianist)
- Evert Bloemsma (photographer and type designer)
- Wilbert Das (fashion designer)
- Lidewij Edelkoort (fashion and trend forecaster)
- Dianne van Giersbergen (Soprano)
- Matteo van der Grijn (actor)
- Sanne Hans (singer)
- Iris van Herpen (fashion designer)
- Tom Holkenborg (DJ, componist and producer)
- Ruud-Jan Kokke (product designer)
- Hanco Kolk (cartoonist)
- Bas Kosters (fashion designer)
- Bertolf Lentink (musician)
- Jeangu Macrooy (musician)
- Martin Majoor (type designer)
- Sinéad O'Dwyer (fashion designer)
- Martijn Oostra (type designer)
- The People of the Labyrinths (fashion designers)
- Daan Roosegaarde (innovator)
- Alexander van Slobbe (fashion designer)
- Jan Taminiau (fashion designer)
- Merlijn Twaalfhoven (composer)
- Jan Vayne (pianist)
- Levi van Veluw (fine arts)
- Marcel Wanders (product designer)
- Ilse Warringa (voice actress)
- Viktor & Rolf (fashion designers)
