= José Mendoza y Almeida =

French illustrator, graphic designer, and type designer (1926–2018)

José Mendoza y Almeida (1926–2018) was a French illustrator, graphic designer and type designer, known for the designs Photina and ITC Mendoza.
