= Otto Arpke =

German artist

- Born: 16 October 1886; Braunschweig, Germany
- Died: 4 December 1943 (aged 57); Berlin
- Known for: Graphic Arts

Otto Arpke (16 October 1886 – 4 December 1943) was a graphic artist, illustrator, painter, and teacher at the Kunst- und Gewerbeschule in Mainz. Arpke was famous for his designs for the movie Das Kabinet des Dr Caligari and posters for the North German Lloyd shipping line. He designed one type face, Arpke Antiqua (1928, Shriftguss type foundry) which is available in digital form as Taiko.

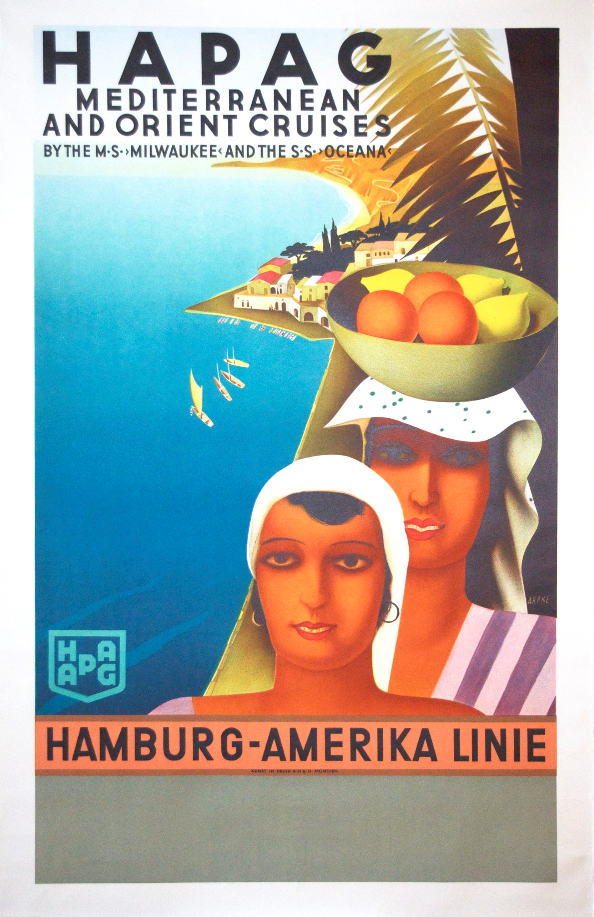
Advertising for the Hamburg America Line (1931)

== See also ==
- List of German painters
