= Alexandra Korolkova =

Russian typeface designer (born 1984)

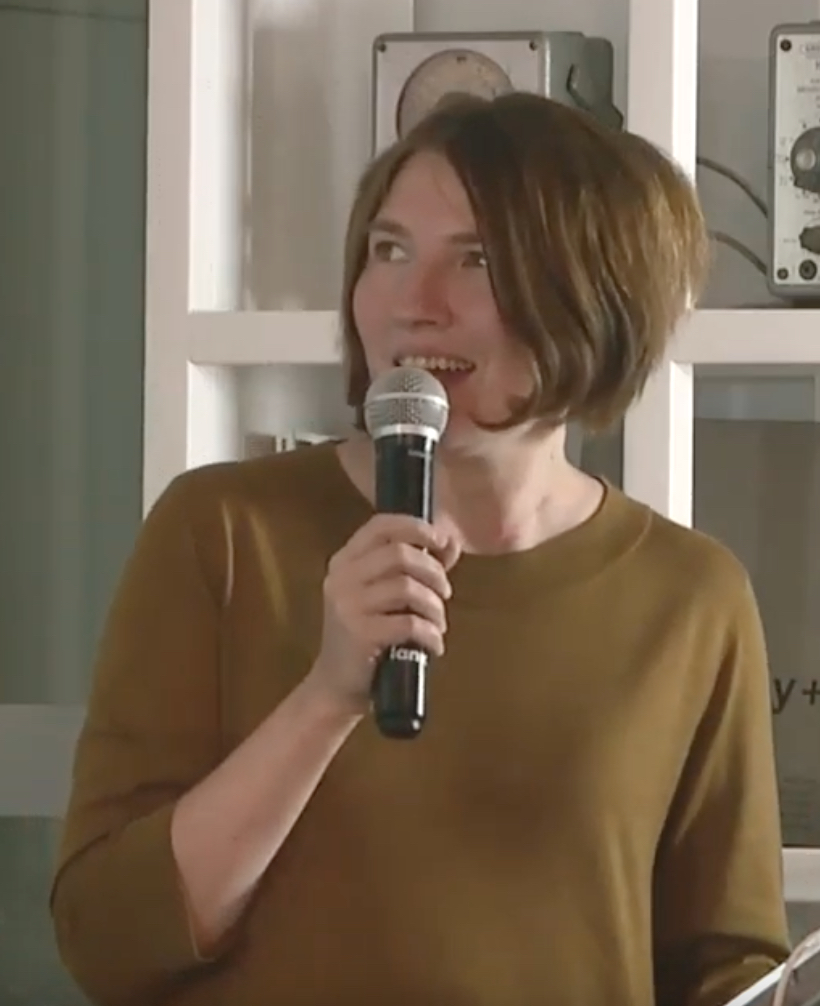
Korolkova in 2016

Alexandra Korolkova (Russian: Александра Королькова) (born Dmitrov, 1984) is a Russian typeface designer and art director at type foundry ParaType. She was awarded the Association Typographique Internationale's infrequently presented Prix Charles Peignot in 2013.

Korolkova's best-known work is probably the PT Fonts project, a partly open-source typeface family commissioned by the Government of Russia's Ministry of Communications as a single family able to support all the common variations of the Cyrillic script used within Russia.

Korolkova studied at the Moscow State University of Printing Arts and has been employed by ParaType since at least 2009. She is the author of the book Living Typography (Russian: Живая типографика) and has given lectures on Cyrillic letter structure.

She has also designed the typefaces: Sber, for Russia's Sberbank; Golos for Russian state and social service websites; Aphrosine; and FF Carina for FontShop.

In 2026 Korolkova was invited to give a presentation at the conference of ATypI. Designers from Ukraine and other countries announced they would not attend due to this as ParaType's CEO has endorsed Putin's invasion of Ukraine.
