= Jos Buivenga =

Dutch typeface designer

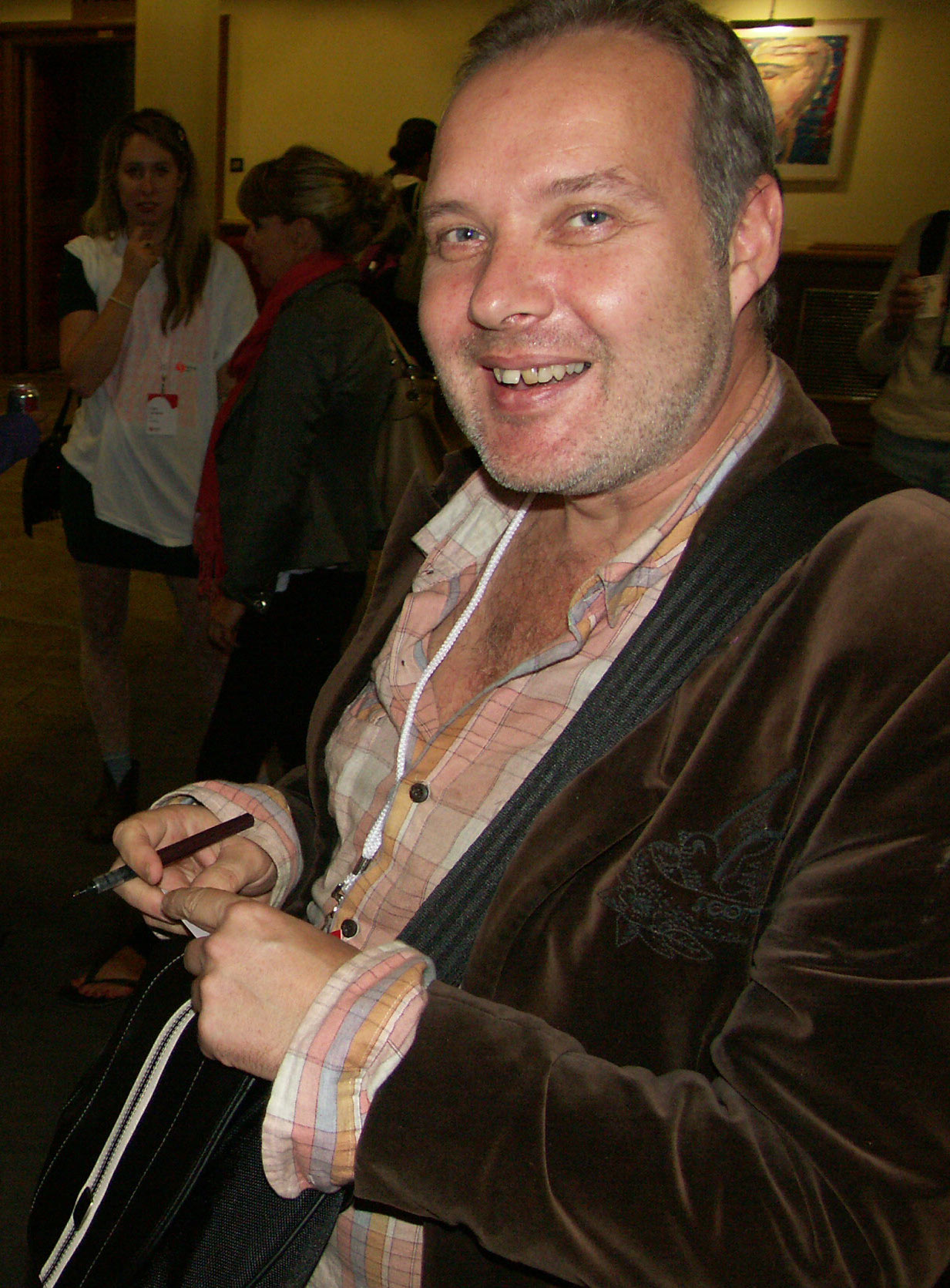
Buivenga in 2010

Jos Buivenga is a Dutch typeface designer. His designs include the Museo and Calluna families and the Questa family in collaboration with Martin Majoor.
