= Evert Bloemsma =

- Born: 1958; Arnhem
- Died: 22 April 2005 (aged 46–47); Apeldoorn
- Education: Academy for Fine Arts

Evert Bloemsma (Dutch pronunciation: [ˈeːvərd ˈblumsmaː]; 1958 – 22 April 2005) was a Dutch photographer, graphic designer, type designer, and art school educator.

== Early life and education ==
Evert Bloemsma was born in 1958.

He studied at the Academy for Fine Arts in Arnhem in the Netherlands. During this time, Bloemsma became fascinated by 'Swiss typography' (which is also referred to as the International Typographic Style internationally and 'functionalist' in The Netherlands).

== Typography ==
=== FF Balance ===
Bloemsma first developed a sans serif typeface. According to Bloemsma himself, serifs had no place in the era of new technologies. However, he was not interested in the typefaces characteristic of the International Typographic Style, Univers and Helvetica. He admired non-conformist work of designers like Roger Excoffon, whose Antique Olive especially caught his eye. This typeface has two unusual features that Bloemsma also incorporated into his own typeface called Balance: it is heavy at the top – sturdier at the top than at the base – and it has an 'inverted stress', the horizontal strokes are heavier than the vertical strokes. This 'inverted stress' has the function of leading the eye along the lines of text, in a similar way as serifs do in serif typefaces. Bloemsma tried to sell the first version of Balance to several different type foundries, like Berthold, Linotype and Monotype.

In 1986 he digitized the typeface with Ikarus M, a software system developed by his then employer URW in Hamburg. In 1992, the PostScript version of the typeface was finished and published as part of the FontFont library (FSI FontShop International) as FF Balance.

=== FF Cocon ===
For his second typeface, FF Cocon, he set out to eliminate every trace of handwriting, as he saw that even Helvetica and Univers contain traces of writing in their stems and terminals. Bloemsma soon realised that removing these elements was more complicated than he expected, as the results often looked unconvincing and unnatural.

Finally, he allowed a calligraphic element into the typeface; he gave the terminals of the stems and extenders an asymmetric rounding. He thought that this treatment also had a practical function, similar to that of FF Balance's top-heavy letterforms; leading the eye forward along the line of text.

=== FF Avance ===
His third typeface, FF Avance, was quite a step for Bloemsma, as it was a serif typeface. He realised that serifs could help a typeface read more easily and thus enhance functionality. In this way, FF Avance was another effort into creating a typeface that leads the eye in a forward direction, this time realised by sturdy serifs that point to the left at the top, and to the right at the base of the characters.

=== FF Legato ===
His last typeface, FF Legato, is an examination of the traditional notion of diagonal contrast or stress, in this case removing the connection of writing with a broad-nib pen. In effect, Bloemsma made the shapes of the counters almost contradict the outside curves, resulting in more interesting and lively letterforms.

Balance and Legato consist both from curved forms – none of the lines are straight – which can be seen as a tribute to his teacher Jan Vermeulen, whose adage ‘a straight line is a dead line’ was a guideline for Bloemsma throughout his type design career.

== Death ==
Bloemsma died on 22 April 2005.
