= Fred Smeijers =

Dutch type designer, researcher and writer

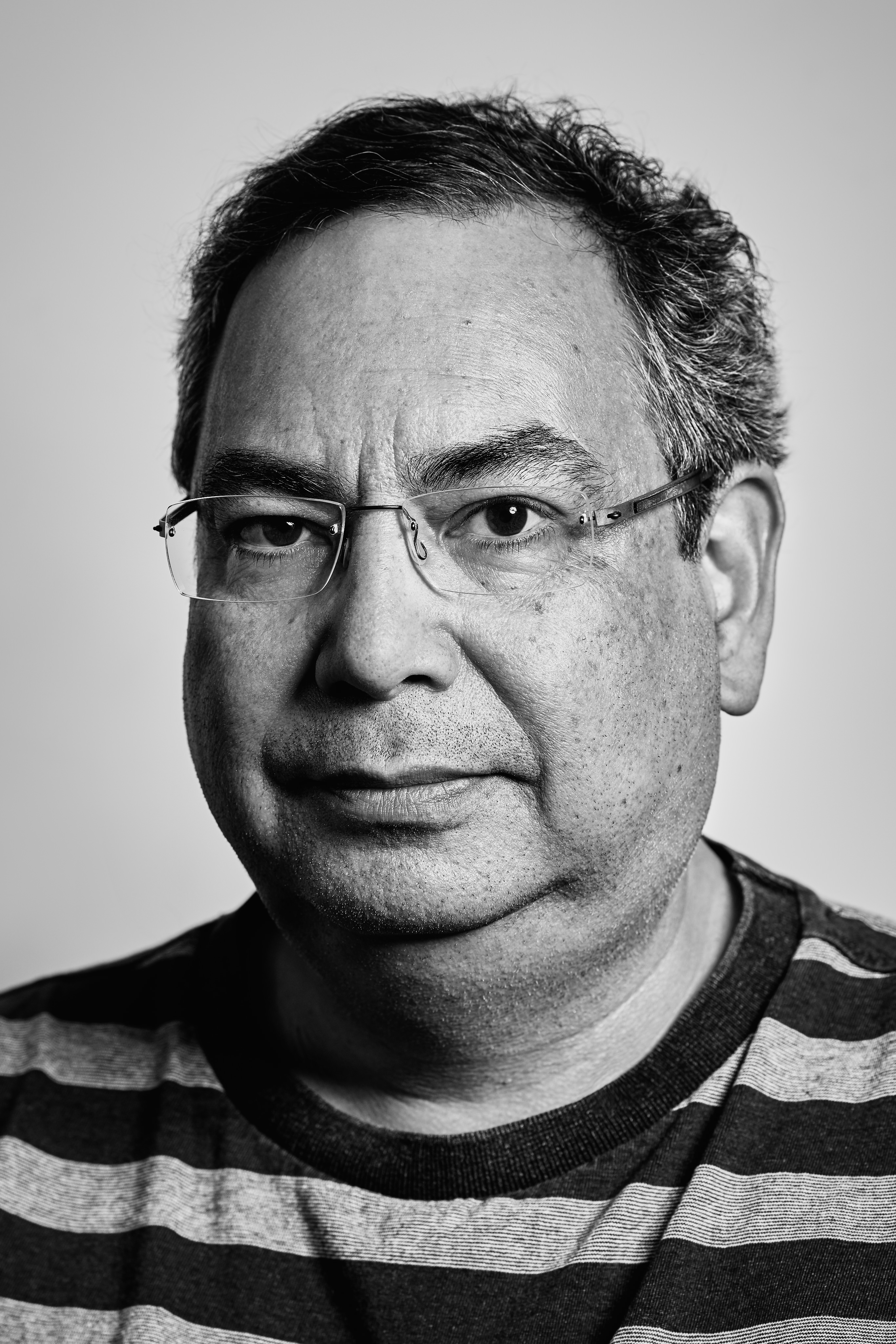
Fred Smeijers, 2018

Fred Smeijers (born 1961) is a Dutch type designer, researcher and writer. He was educated at the ArtEZ Hogeschool voor de Kunsten in Arnhem in the early 1980s.

Smeijers is the creative director and co-founder of the typeface design and publishing company Type By. In 2019 Smeijers was appointed Professor in Typeface Design at the University of Reading in the UK.

== Work ==
Arnhem, a text typeface designed by Smeijers, originally for the Nederlandse Staatscourant.

Smeijers was born in Eindhoven in 1961. After his graduation, Smeijers worked for Océ – a Dutch manufacturer of printing and copying hardware. Between 1986 and 1990, he worked at the Océ's industrial design department as a typographic advisor, designing typefaces for early laser printers. In the mid-1980s Smeijers started to develop an interest in the early 16th century technique of punchcutting. The insights he acquired from these experiments influence the way he designs typefaces. This became first apparent in his typeface FF Quadraat, a classic book typeface with interesting and innovative details. Other Smeijers' retail typefaces are FF Quadraat Sans, FF Quadraat Display, FF Quadraat Headliner, and FF Quadraat Mono (FontFont); Renard (The Enschedé Font Foundry), Nobel (co-designed with Andrea Fuchs, Dutch Type Library); Arnhem, Arnhem Display, Arnhem Fine, Fresco, Fresco Sans, Fresco Informal, Custodia, Sansa, Monitor, Ludwig, Puncho, Bery, Bery Roman, and Bery Tuscan (OurType); Haultin (based on the work of Pierre Haultin), Lyonnaise, Gantoise, Sloan, Lambrusco. Smeijers has also designed custom typefaces and iconic logos for Philips, Canon-Europe, TomTom, Samsung, Porsche, among others. Public architectural lettering projects include the IJsei terminal in Amsterdam (designed with Erik Vos, Het lab) for Benthem Crouwel Architects and city of Amsterdam.

Smeijers is a research fellow at Plantin Moretus Museum in Antwerp, Professor of Type Design at the Hochschule für Grafik und Buchkunst in Leipzig, at the University of Reading, and at the Royal Academy of Arts in The Hague.

In 2000 Smeijers received the prestigious Gerrit Noordzij Prize, awarded by The Royal Academy of Arts in The Hague to honor innovations in typeface design and outstanding contribution to type education and writing. In 2016, Smeijers received the Typography Award from the Society of Typographic Aficionados (SOTA).

Smeijers was formerly a founding partner of OurType, with entrepreneur Rudy Geeraerts and typographer Corina Cotorobai, stepping down as the foundry's artistic director in 2017.

In 2019 Fred Smeijers and Corina Cotorobai partnered to establish a new font publishing label Type By.

Smeijers is the author of Counterpunch and Type Now, Hyphen Press, London.

== Publications ==
- Fred Smeijers, Counterpunch, making type in the sixteenth century, designing typefaces now, Hyphen Press, London (1996, 2011), ISBN 978-0-907259-42-8
- Fred Smeijers, Les Contrepoinçons : Fabriquer des caractères typographiques au XVIe siècle, dessiner des familles de caractères aujourd'hui, B42, Paris (2014), ISBN 9782917855515
- Fred Smeijers, Contrapunçao : fabricando tipos no século dezesseis, projetando tipos hoje, Estereográfica, ISBN 978-85-68809-03-7
- Fred Smeijers, Kaunta panchi : Jurokuseiki no katsuji seisaku to gendai no shotai dezain (Japanese), Musashino University Press, Tokyo (2014), ISBN 978-4864630191
- Fred Smeijers, Type Now, Hyphen Press, London (2003), ISBN 978-0-907259-24-4
- Fred Smeijers et al., Vom Buch auf die Straße, HGB Academy of Book Arts, Leipzig (2014), ISBN 978-3-932865-86-2
- Fred Smeijers, Julia Blume, Ein Jahrhundert Schrift und Schriftunterricht in Leipzig, HGB Academy of Book Arts, Leipzig (2010), ISBN 978-3-932865-57-2
- Fred Smeijers (Introduction), Karbid : Berlin, de la lettre peinte au caractère typographique, Ypsilon Editeur, Paris (2013), ISBN 978-2-356540-24-9
