= Robert Henry Harling =

British typographer, designer, journalist and novelist (1910–2008)

Robert Henry Harling (27 March 1910 in London – 1 July 2008 in Godstone, Surrey) was a British typographer, designer, journalist and novelist who lived to the age of 98.

== Early life and work ==
Robert Harling's success came despite an unpromising upbringing. He was born in Highbury, London, in 1910, and was orphaned at an early age being brought up by his mother's friend, a nurse whom he regarded as an aunt. After her marriage they moved to Brighton, bringing him in contact with the Royal Pavilion, and a lifelong appreciation for architecture and design, and the Sea, where he learnt to swim and sail. With the death of his uncle he returned to Islington with his aunt, and was enrolled in Owen's School. This was the story he put about. "Later research showed this was complete invention. He grew up and went to school in Islington, with a living mother and a father who drove a London taxi. He had a brother and a first wife who, like his parents, had been ruthlessly excised by Harling from his biography, and came as a revelation to his middle-aged children."

He attributed his interest in lettering from his study of Pears' Cyclopaedia, which he was given on his 12th birthday. He was fascinated by the reproductions of assay marks for plate, fine examples of English vernacular lettering. His "uncle" would enlarge them for him photographically so he could laboriously copy them. This love of letter-forms and contemporary gothic led him to the Central School of Arts and Crafts, having rejected a place at Oxford.

He briefly kept a bookshop in Lamb's Conduit Street, and then got a job as a trainee at the Daily Mail, but as he would tell friends later "left, quite untrained, a year later". Two six-month stints followed at two of the best printers in the country, Lund Humphries at Bradford (for whom he mounted an exhibition on Rudolf Koch in 1935) and the Kynoch Press at Birmingham, "trying – not all that successfully – to learn more about the technical side of printing". This led him to write and publish two books prior to the war: The London Miscellany (1937) and Home: a vignette (1938). Both drew on his love of 19th-century architecture and design. By the start of the war, he was becoming known as an expert on typography and design. In 1940 he was named an associate editor of Art and Industry.

== World War Two, Royal Navy and Ian Fleming ==
In 1939 Robert Harling met Ian Fleming, the meeting was (as Harling found later) no accident. Fleming, was serving in Naval Intelligence, and had heard about Harling's editorship of the Typography journal, which was setting new standards for the design and display of printed matter. During their meeting he learned that Harling was also writer and designer of "News-Reel Maps" for the News Chronicle, and "demi-semi-resident art director" of Lord Delamere's up-and-coming advertising agency. This led him to commission Harling to redesign the Admiralty's weekly intelligence report, but they were not to meet again until 1941.

Harling, a keen amateur sailor, volunteered for the Royal Navy. Before he finished training, under the legendary Captain O. M. Watts, he found himself at Dunkirk in charge of a whaler. Sub-Lieutenant Harling, RNVR, next found himself navigator of a corvette, on convoy duty in the Western Approaches. This led him to write The Steep Atlantick Stream, published by Chatto & Windus in 1946, based on his experiences in the North Atlantic and Mediterranean between 1941 and 1942.

Following a meeting in London in 1941 Fleming recruited Harling to work in the Inter-Service Topographical Department (ISTD), where he put him to work examining photographs of enemy held terrain and applying the knowledge he had gained researching maps for the News Chronicle. This led to an adventurous air-trip to various parts of the world to collect data.

On forming 30AU (30 Assault Unit) Fleming again tapped Harling. Landing soon after D-Day, he pursued the task assigned to the unit to pick up enemy code-books, security documents and wireless equipment through fierce fighting round Cherbourg, and on into France. Cautious, eventually cordial relations with American forces brought a memorable meeting with General George Patton, which was followed by a lightning dash across Germany to Magdeburg to round up German scientists. A final mission to Norway to disarm German naval forces brought a close to Harling's war.

== Immediate Post-War Career ==
In between convoy duty and the ISTD Harling had redesigned the ailing Daily Sketch for Lord Kemsley, who liked Harling's work but thought it too advanced. He now invited Harling to become typographical adviser to The Sunday Times, where his friend Fleming had become Foreign News Manager. With his old friend James Shand, printer and sponsor of Typography, he launched a new journal, Alphabet and Image (1946–48), which later became Image (1949–52). He was also given a larger room in the Delamere advertising agency, and was a consultant to The Financial Times and in 1947 redesigned Time and Tide for Lady Rhondda.

Harling now turned his hand to writing a number of popular 'pulp fiction' titles including: The Paper Palace (1951), The Dark Saviour (1952), The Enormous Shadow (1955), The Endless Colonnade (1958), The Hollow Sunday (1967), The Athenian Widow (1974) and finally The Summer Portrait (1979).

Fleming, too, had taken to thrillers, and their friendship continued to increase during the period, despite Bond taking over his creator's life to an alarming extent. In 1957 Fleming was about to go to New York, when Harling suggested that he might sound out "Pat" (Iva Patcevitch), the head of Condé Nast, about the editorship of House & Garden. Fleming was astounded that his friend Harling wanted the job, but did what he was asked, and the deal was done surprisingly quickly.

== House & Garden ==
Harling now established a new routine, four days at House & Garden, and Friday and Saturday at The Sunday Times, where he was architectural correspondent as well as designer (and from 1961 he would become Editor of the Sunday Telegraph).

At House and Garden he had a staff of 18 which included Leonie Highton, and later John Bridges, and three advisers: Elizabeth David (on food), Loelia, Duchess of Westminster (to discover unknown houses), and Olive Sullivan (on interior design). With his crew he revitalised House & Garden, and produced a Magazine in Britain which would contrast the ancient and modern, colour and simplicity.

Besides the magazine, he launched a series of books on the same theme, starting in 1959 with House & Garden Interiors and Colour. Ten more books followed, his last contributions being the House & Garden Book of Romantic Rooms (1985), and House & Garden Book of Classic Rooms (1989); in 1980 with Miles Hadfield he published British Gardeners: a biographical dictionary – this being a reworking of Pioneers in Gardening a book which he had developed with Miles Hadfield and Leonie Highton thirty five years earlier.

== Later life ==
Harling would admit that some of the fun of life diminished following the death of his friend Fleming in 1964, but he remained alert and active, and could still be found at The Sunday Times late on Saturday evenings until 1985. Nor did his interest in the graphic arts wain. His publication The Letter-forms and Type-designs of Eric Gill (1976) is still considered the best assessment of Gill's work, which perhaps is no surprise given Harling was also a master of lettering. He also contributed his memories to The Wood-engravings of Tirzah Ravilious (1987).

Harling's contribution to Printing and Publishing is his approach to helping younger designers, editors, and authors understand the Harling style, many of whom he has outlived. His emphasis on clarity, simplicity, and economy in design remained consistent throughout his career.

Robert Henry Harling, typographer, graphic artist and designer, editor and novelist: born London 27 March 1910. Married Phoebe Konstam (who predeceased him in 2006) in April 1945, having met at the Gargoyle Club. They had two sons and a daughter, and set up home at an old house in Suffolk, before moving to an 18th-century Gothic vicarage on the Kent-Sussex border in 1953, which was made more picturesque by the removal of a later top floor. He died on 1 June 2008, at Godstone, Surrey.

== Selected Books and other work ==
- British Gardeners. A biographical dictionary, Miles Hadfield, Robert Harling & Leonie Highton. Condé Nast, London (1980)
- The Summer Portrait (1979)
- The Letterforms and Type Designs of Eric Gill (1976)
- Guide to interior decoration (House & garden), Robert Harling, Leonie Highton, Yvonne Jaques, Nigel Kendall. London, Condé Nast (1967)
- The Hollow Sunday (1967)
- The Endless Colonnade (1958)
- Pioneers in Gardening, Miles Hadfield, Robert Harling, Leonie Highton. Routledge & Kegan Paul Ltd, London (1955)
- The Enormous Shadow (1955)
- The Dark Saviour (1952)
- The Paper Palace (Chatto & Windus, London 1951)
- The Drawings of Edward Bawden (1950)
- The Steep Atlantic Stream, Chatto and Windus, London 1946
- Notes on the Wood-engravings of Eric Ravilious (1945)
- Amateur Sailor (1944) reprinted in 1952 under his own name
- Home: a vignette (1938)
- The London Miscellany. A 19th Century Scrapbook (Heinemann, London 1937)
- Ian Fleming: A Personal Memoir (The Robson Press, London 2015)

== Selected Achievements ==
- Editor of Condé Nast's UK and European magazine House & Garden (1957– )
- Editor of The Sunday Telegraph (1961– )
- Designed the periodical Art and Industry (1940)
- He worked for several other newspapers including: Sunday Times, Times Literary Supplement, Financial Times, both editing, writing, designing layout and typesetting.
- His work can be seen to the present day as he was responsible for the current, and iconic, external design and typography of the Wisden Cricketers' Almanack.

== Fonts ==
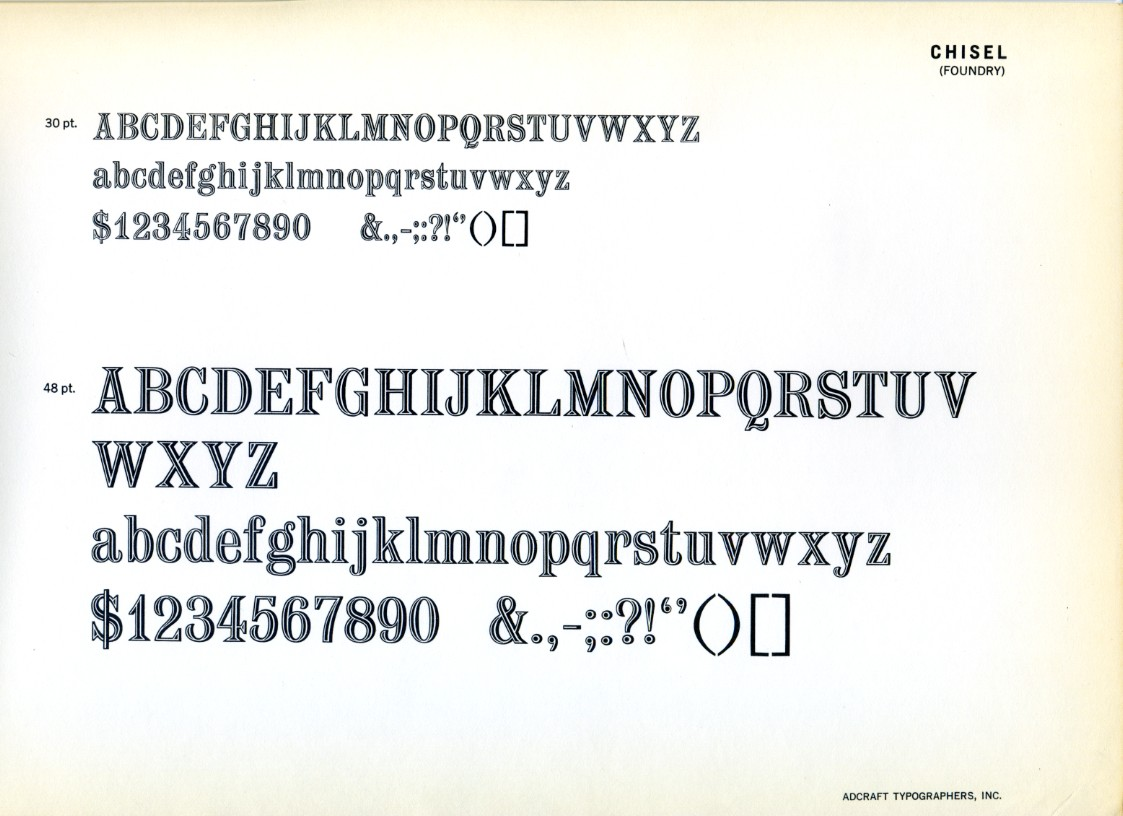
Robert Harling's "Chisel" typeface, an adaptation of a "Latin" or wedge-serif face.

- Playbill (1938), a French Clarendon design inspired by theatre and circus posters. Known for being bundled with some Microsoft software.
- Tea Chest (1939), a stencil design inspired by old boxes and industry
- Chisel (1939), inscriptional

All three designs were created for Sheffield type-foundry Stephenson Blake and inherited by other companies after it left the printing market. They are single-style designs with no italics; Tea Chest has no lower-case characters.
