= FontShop International =

Digital type foundry

- Type: GmbH
- Industry: Type foundry, stock photography
- Founded: Berlin, Germany (1990)
- Founders: Joan Spiekermann, Erik Spiekermann, Neville Brody
- Defunct: July 14, 2014
- Fate: Acquired by Monotype
- Headquarters: Berlin, Germany
- Key people: Petra Weitz, CEO
- Products: Fonts, Digital images
- Website: www.fontshop.com

FontShop International (FSI) was an international manufacturer of digital typefaces (fonts), based in Berlin. It was one of the largest digital type foundries.

The FontFont library of fonts contains designs by 160 type designers, including Peter Biľak, Evert Bloemsma, Erik van Blokland, Neville Brody, Martin Majoor, Albert-Jan Pool, Hans Reichel, Just van Rossum, Fred Smeijers, and Erik Spiekermann. The aim of FontFont is to offer typefaces by designers for designers.

FontShop International was acquired by Monotype Imaging on July 14, 2014. The deal came as part of Monotype's takeover of many of the other large digital type retailers, including Linotype, Monotype, ITC, and Bitstream.

In August 2023, Monotype announced that it would be closing the FontShop e-commerce site, together with Linotype and Fonts.com. In its announcement, Monotype stated that it could no longer maintain its desired level of quality across the legacy platforms and would instead be focussing its efforts on developing its MyFonts site.

== History ==
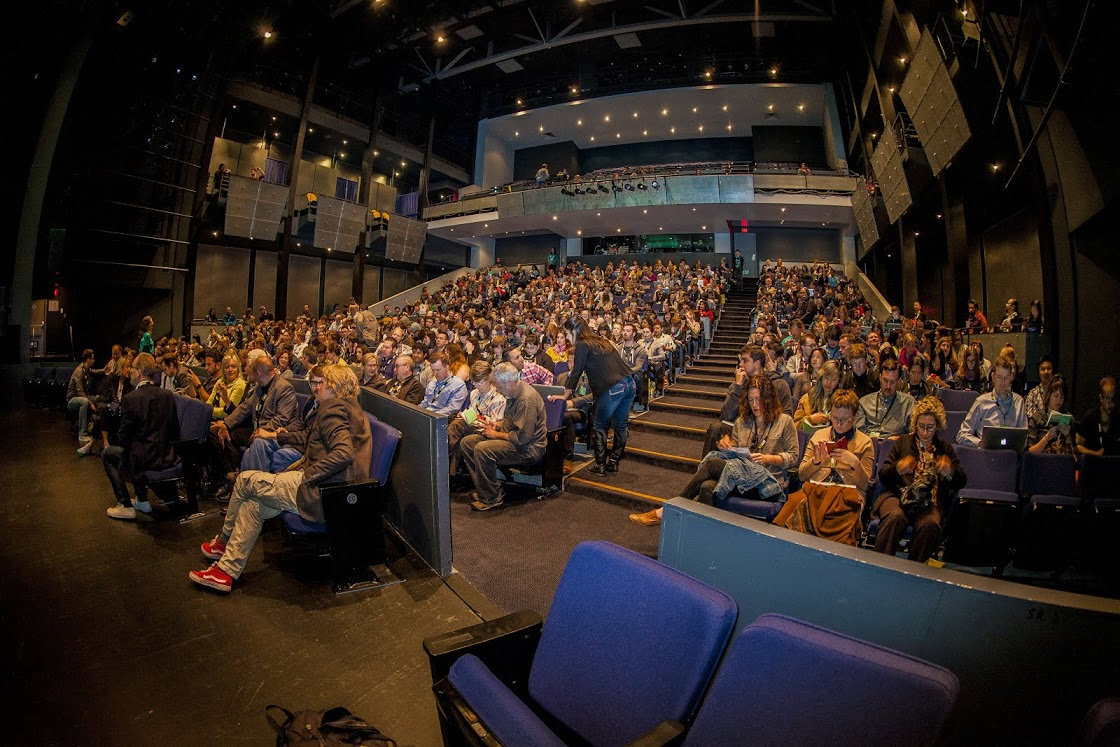
The Typo San Francisco conference in 2014 was organised by FontShop.

After founding the first German reseller of typefaces FontShop on June 12, 1991, Joan Spiekermann, Erik Spiekermann, and Neville Brody started an independent type foundry just one year later. They commissioned a few young type designers to make the first few FontFonts. The first font ever was FF Beowolf by the Dutch Erik van Blokland and Just van Rossum in 1990. It was called a “living” font because it used a random feature of the PostScript language to generate randomly different letter forms each time when printed. The library has grown over the years by numerous FF releases (being 59 until May 2012) and is now one of the world's largest collections of contemporary type designs.

Between 1991 and 2000 FontShop International published together with Neville Brody 18 issues of the experimental typographical magazine FUSE and organised several FUSE conferences, the forerunners of the annual European design conference TYPO Berlin.

In 2001, FontShop International founded their own stock photo agency called ƒStop and introduced it to the stock photography market.

In February 2010, FSI was the first font manufacturer to publish web fonts in the new WOFF format, which, in combination with the EOT Lite format supported by Microsoft Internet Explorer, supports the majority of current browsers and restricts web designers to the system fonts that are installed on all website visitors. These web fonts are linked to the elements of a website in such a way that HTML texts have the same, individual typography for all visitors.

== Company structure ==
FontShop International was licensor for four FontShops in Austria, Benelux, Germany, and the United States. FontShop USA, based in San Francisco, was owned by FontShop International; all the other FontShops are separate, independent companies concentrating on their own markets. While FontShop International publishes typefaces as a foundry, the FontShops worked as resellers of FontShop International's FontFonts but also of fonts from other foundries (111 in August 2011).

FontShop International's legal form was GmbH.

== FontFont ==
The main focus at FontShop International was the extension and maintenance of the FontFont typeface library. Fonts published as FontFonts were always named using the prefix FF. Besides text and headline fonts such as FF Dax, FF DIN, FF Meta, FF Quadraat, and FF Scala there were also special designs like the “dirty” or grunge typography typewriter font FF Trixie, the “living” font FF Beowolf and digital handwriting fonts FF Erikrighthand and FF Justlefthand (FF Hands package). The library consists of over different 700 font families.

Type designers could submit their own type designs for publication in the FontFont library. A committee of internal experts (TypeBoard) reviewed submissions for aesthetical, technical, and marketing aspects and decides about publication in the library. A basic prerequisite was that the type designs were original.

== FontBook ==
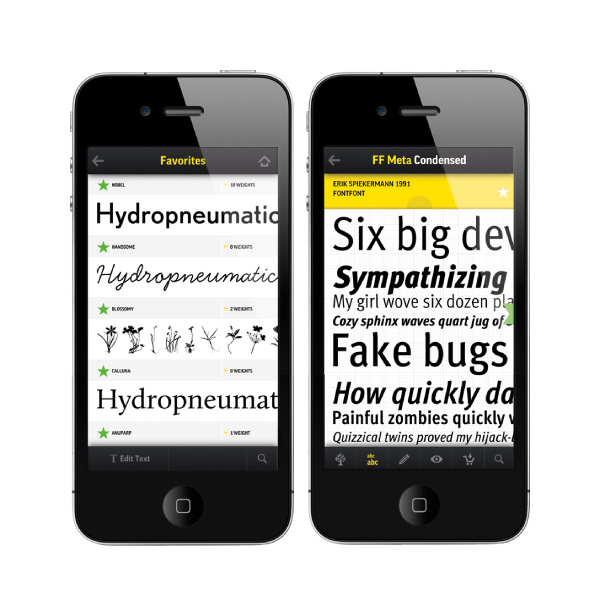
Screens of the FontBook mobile app in 2013.

FontShop International was also publisher of the FontBook. The FontBook is an independent compendium of digital typefaces. The first edition was published in 1991 and revised and extended three times to show as many new and updated typefaces as possible. The last edition, the fourth edition from September 2006, contained 1,760 pages with showings of 32,000 typefaces by 90 international foundries, being the largest printed type reference book of the world. In addition to the type specimens, users could find information about the type designer, year of publication, style category, language versions and see-also references to similar alternate typefaces.

In 2011, FontShop International published the first digital version of the FontBook. The iPad app contains 620,000 typeface specimens by 110 international type foundries.

== fStop ==
FontShop International also published the image library fStop, named as a reference to the f-numbers of photography. At present, 22,000 royalty-free photos by 150 photographers are offered (December 2008). The images are distributed directly as well as via some of the FontShops and Getty Images.

== FontStruct ==
FontStruct.com is a website where registered users can create, share and download modular, grid-based typefaces. The idea was pitched by Rob Meek of Meek Design to FontShop in 2006". FontStruct is a free font-building tool, as described on its website home page, "Build, Share, Download Fonts. It's simple and free!". To register, users have to give an email address or username, and a password. After the demise of FontShop International, the website has continued as an independent service, with support from other sponsors in the type design field. As of March 19, 2025, FontStruct has more than 2.58 million registered users and more than 2.64 million FontStructions.

== Literature ==
- Spiekermann, Erik; Middendorp, Jan: Made with FontFont, Book Industry Services (BIS): 2006, ISBN 978-90-6369-129-5
- Thi Truong, Mai-Linh; Siebert, Jürgen; Spiekermann, Erik: FontBook – Digital Typeface Compendium, FSI FontShop International: 2006, ISBN 978-3-930023-04-2
- Jubert, Roxane, Typography and Graphic Design, From Antiquity to the Present. Flammarion: 2006, ISBN 2-08-030523-9
- Schuler, Günter: Typomarken, Markentypo – Die Herkunft der Schriften in Libraries, in Publishing Praxis: 1–2/2008. 14. Jahrgang, Deutscher Drucker Verlagsgesellschaft: 2008, ISSN 0948-1931
