= FontBook =

Typeface compendium

- Editor: Erik Spiekermann; Jürgen Siebert; Mai-Linh Thi Truong
- Publisher: FSI FontShop International
- Publication date: 1991
- ISBN: 3-930023-04-0

FontBook is a typeface compendium in hardback published by FSI FontShop International and edited by Erik Spiekermann, Jürgen Siebert, and Mai-Linh Thi Truong. Published in 1991, it has been revised four times, with the latest edition published in September 2006. This fourth edition contains 32,000 samples of fonts from 90 international type foundries. In addition to type samples, FontBook also contains historical footnotes (such as the type designer's name and typeface's date of creation) and cross-references to fonts of similar style.

- ISBN 3-930023-04-0

In July 2011, FSI published the first digital version of the FontBook. The iPad app contains 620,000 typeface specimens from 110 international type foundries.
