= The Elements of Typographic Style =

1992 book by Robert Bringhurst

- Cover of the Canadian first edition
- Author: Robert Bringhurst
- Language: English
- Subject: Typography
- Publisher: Hartley & Marks Publishers
- Publication date: 1992
- Publication place: Canada
- Media type: Print (hardcover · paperback)
- Pages: 254 (first edition)
- ISBN: 978-0-88179-110-5
- Dewey Decimal: 686.2/24 20
- LC Class: Z246 .B74 1992

The Elements of Typographic Style is a book on typography and style by Canadian typographer, poet and translator Robert Bringhurst. Originally published in 1992 by Hartley & Marks Publishers, it was revised in 1996, 2001 (v2.4), 2002 (v2.5), 2004 (v3.0), 2005 (v3.1), 2008 (v3.2), and 2012 (v4.0). A history and guide to typography, it has been praised by Hermann Zapf, who said "I wish to see this book become the Typographers' Bible." Jonathan Hoefler and Tobias Frere-Jones consider it "the finest book ever written about typography," according to the FAQ section of their type foundry's website. Because of its status as a respected and frequently cited resource, typographers and designers often refer to it simply as Bringhurst.

The title alludes to The Elements of Style, the classic guide to writing by Strunk and White.

== Editions ==
- First edition: Hartley & Marks Publishers, 1992, 254pp, ISBN 0-88179-110-5 (hardcover)
- Second edition: Hartley & Marks Publishers, 1996, 352pp, ISBN 0-88179-133-4 (hardcover), ISBN 0-88179-132-6 (paperback)
- Third edition: Hartley & Marks Publishers, 2005, ISBN 0-88179-205-5 (hardcover), ISBN 0-88179-206-3 (paperback)
- Fourth edition: Hartley & Marks Publishers, 2012, ISBN 0-88179-211-X (hardcover), ISBN 0-88179-212-8 (paperback)

== See also ==
- Anatomy of a Typeface
