= Klim Type Foundry =

New Zealand type foundry

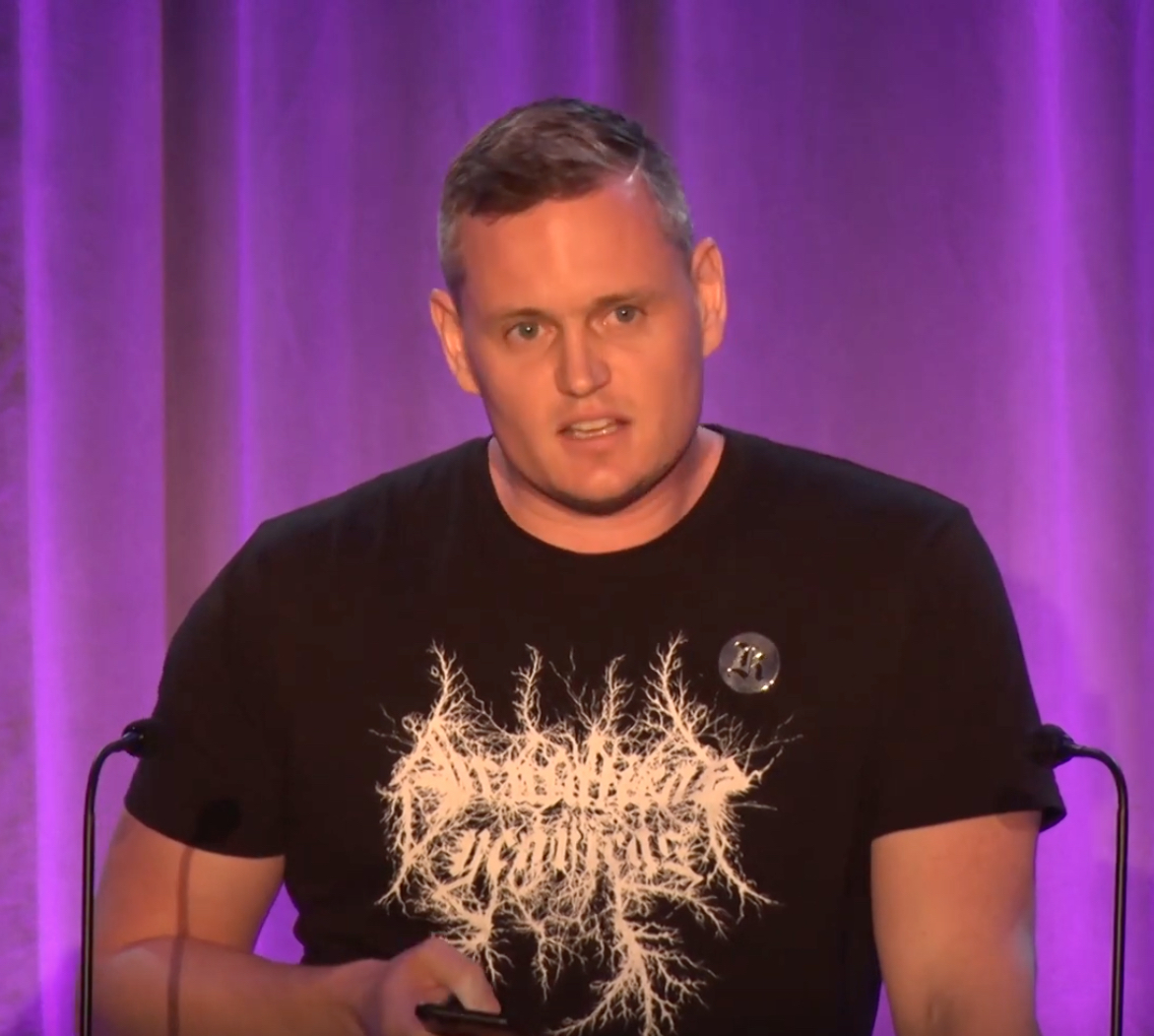
Kris Sowersby speaking at TypeCon2018

The Klim Type Foundry is a digital type foundry operated by Kris Sowersby, a New Zealand typeface designer. Klim was founded in 2005 and is currently based in Wellington. Klim produces retail typefaces, custom typefaces and custom lettering and logotypes. Sowersby has garnered many international awards for his typefaces.

== Kris Sowersby ==
Sowersby, born in 1981, graduated from the Wanganui School of Design in 2003. 'Feijoa', his first retail typeface, was released in 2007, followed by 'National'. National first gained him international recognition, winning a Type Directors Club award in 2008. His typefaces 'Hardys' and 'Serrano' won the same recognition in 2009. Sowersby has collaborated with other notable designers, including Christian Schwartz and Erik Spiekermann in the design of 'FF Meta Serif'.

Sowerby's lettering also appears in the logos for the Harvard Business Review and the Bank of New Zealand.

== Major projects ==
=== Pure Pākati ===
In 2015 Sowersby created a custom typeface for Tourism New Zealand with Rangi Kipa, Philip Kelly and Karl Wixon. Sowersby devised letterforms which were carved on blocks of kauri by Kipa, which were then inked, printed and digitised to create the typeface.

=== Financial Times redesign ===
In 2014, Sowersby was commissioned to produce a new custom typeface, 'Financier', for the redesign of the business and economics daily newspaper, the Financial Times. The paper's head of design stated that they wanted "an elegant, authoritative serif with the versatility to handle news and features stories (in the arts, science and sport, as well as finance)" and a connection to its 'British heritage'. Sowersby has noted that he looked to typefaces by Eric Gill in his research for the new typeface.

'Financier' was awarded a gold pin in New Zealand's Best Awards in 2015.

=== Air New Zealand ===
In 2012 Sowersby was commissioned, with design company Designworks, to create custom lettering for New Zealand carrier Air New Zealand.

=== National Geographic redesign ===
Since the brand's 2016 refocusing on "smart science" across all media, it has gradually transitioned to a bespoke type palette. Their first commissioned typeface was Grosvenor, a custom version of Klim Type Foundry's Tiempos with longer extenders, for article text in National Geographic magazine. In 2018, this was accompanied by Geograph, a geometric sans serif, replacing Hoefler & Co.'s Verlag across all branded media. These two new types were accompanied by two new headline faces and a new magazine nameplate from Tal Leming starting in the May 2018 issue.

=== Hokotohu ===
In 2007, Sowersby, under the direction of DNA Design, designed ‘Hokotohu’, with its serifs based on Rākau momori, for the Hokotehi Moriori Trust.

=== PayPal ===
In 2014, the PayPal product team commissioned Klim to create a typeface that "should be fluid, delightful, easy, calm and humanistic." It should also be "mobile-first, numeral-centric" and "space-efficient". After three different approaches, the foundry settled on 'Dutch', made with inspiration from Jan van Krimpen's Romulus Sans Serif. This later became PayPal Sans, which has two subfamilies: PayPal Sans Big, and PayPal Sans Small.
