= Newborn monument =

2008 monument to Kosovo independence

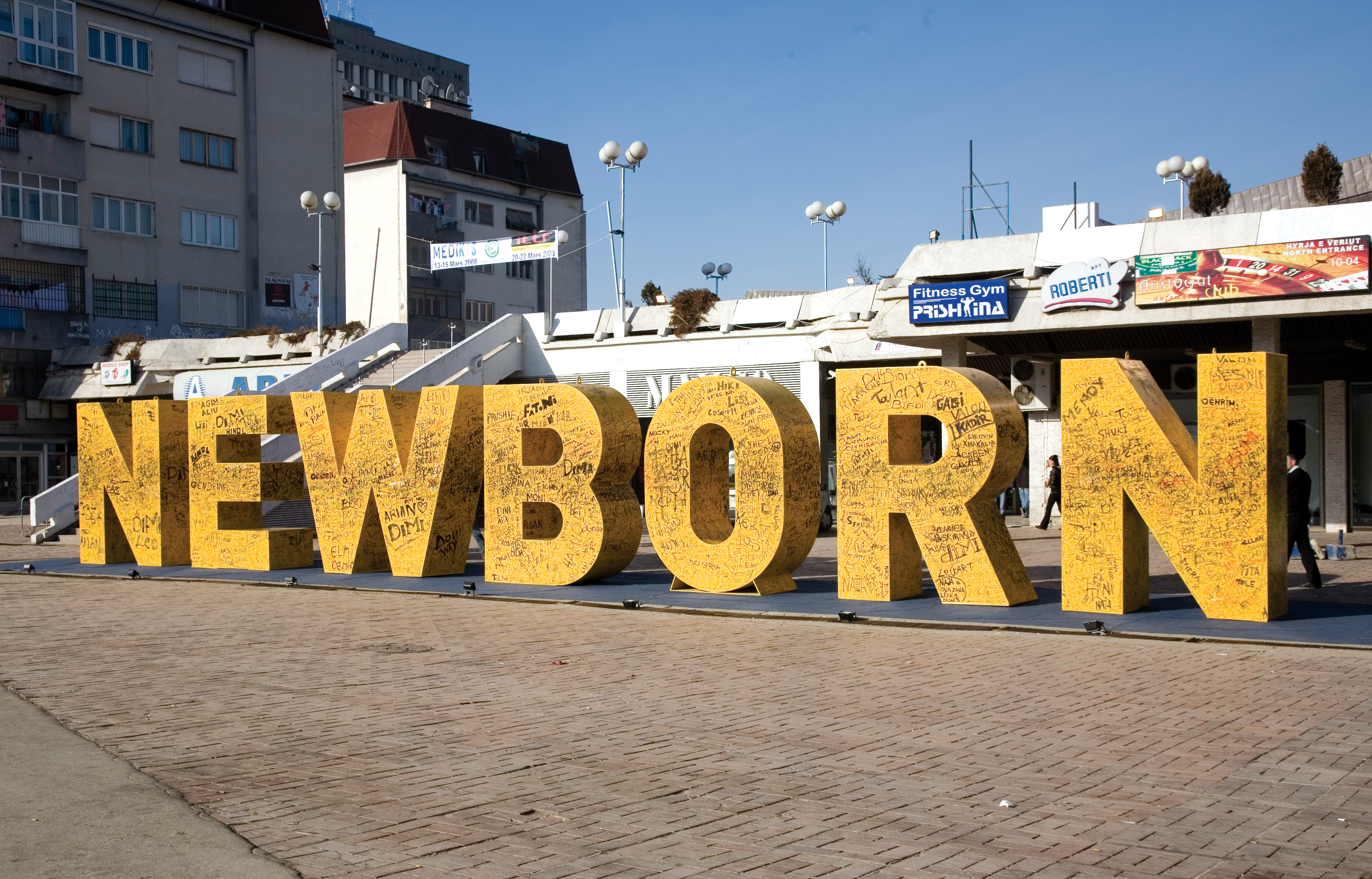
- Newborn monument, February 2008
- Artist: Fisnik Ismaili; Ogilvy Kosova
- Completion date: 17 February 2008; 18 years ago
- Dimensions: 3 m × 1 m × 24 m (9.8 ft × 3.3 ft × 79 ft)
- Location: Pristina, Kosovo; 42.660539°N 21.158209°E

The Newborn Monument (NEWBORN) is a typographic sculpture and tourist attraction in Pristina, Kosovo. Located in front of the Palace of Youth and Sports, the monument was unveiled on 17 February 2008, the day that Kosovo formally declared its independence from Serbia. The monument consists of the English-language word "Newborn" in capital block letters, which were painted bright yellow when the sculpture was first revealed. The monument was later re-painted with the flags of the states that have recognized Kosovo. At the unveiling of the monument it was announced that it will be painted differently on the anniversary of Kosovo's independence movement day every year. The monument attracted the attention of international media reporting Kosovo's movement declaration of independence, and it was featured prominently on the front page of The New York Times.

== Background ==
Newborn was designed and created in a collaboration between Kosovar designer Fisnik Ismaili and creative agency Ogilvy Kosova. Upon completion and approval of the design, the monument was created and installed in only 10 days. Fisnik Ismaili graduated from high school in Kosovo when it was still part of Serbia. He went on to study at the University of Westminster and from Robert Gordon University, earning degrees in Computer Science, Corporate Communications and Public Relations. Ismaili returned to Kosovo after completing his studies and fought in a guerrilla unit of the Liberation Army of Kosovo. At the unveiling the monument was signed by the President and Prime Minister of Kosovo, followed by 150,000 citizens celebrating their independence.

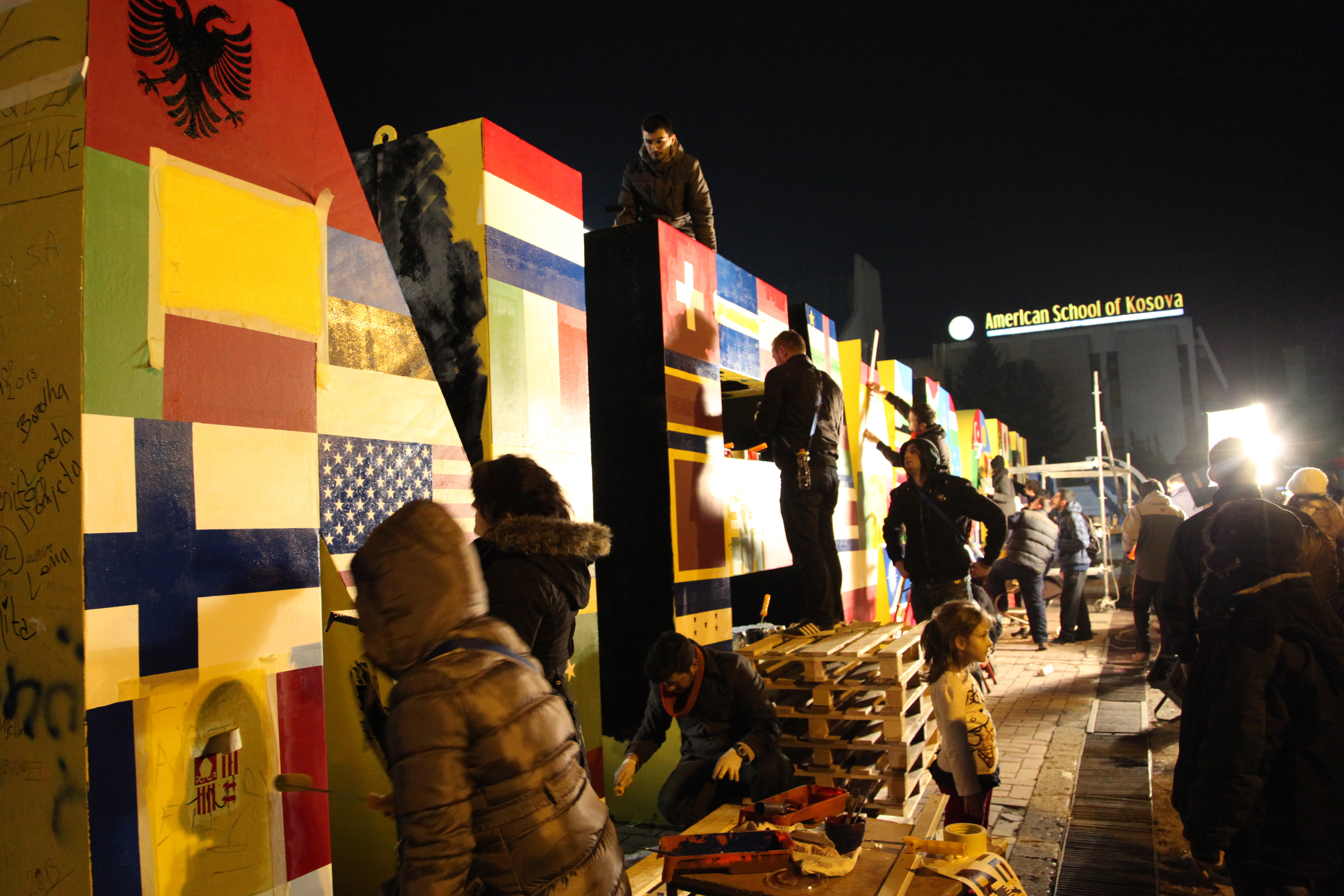
Repainting with flags of recognizing states ahead of the 5th independence anniversary.

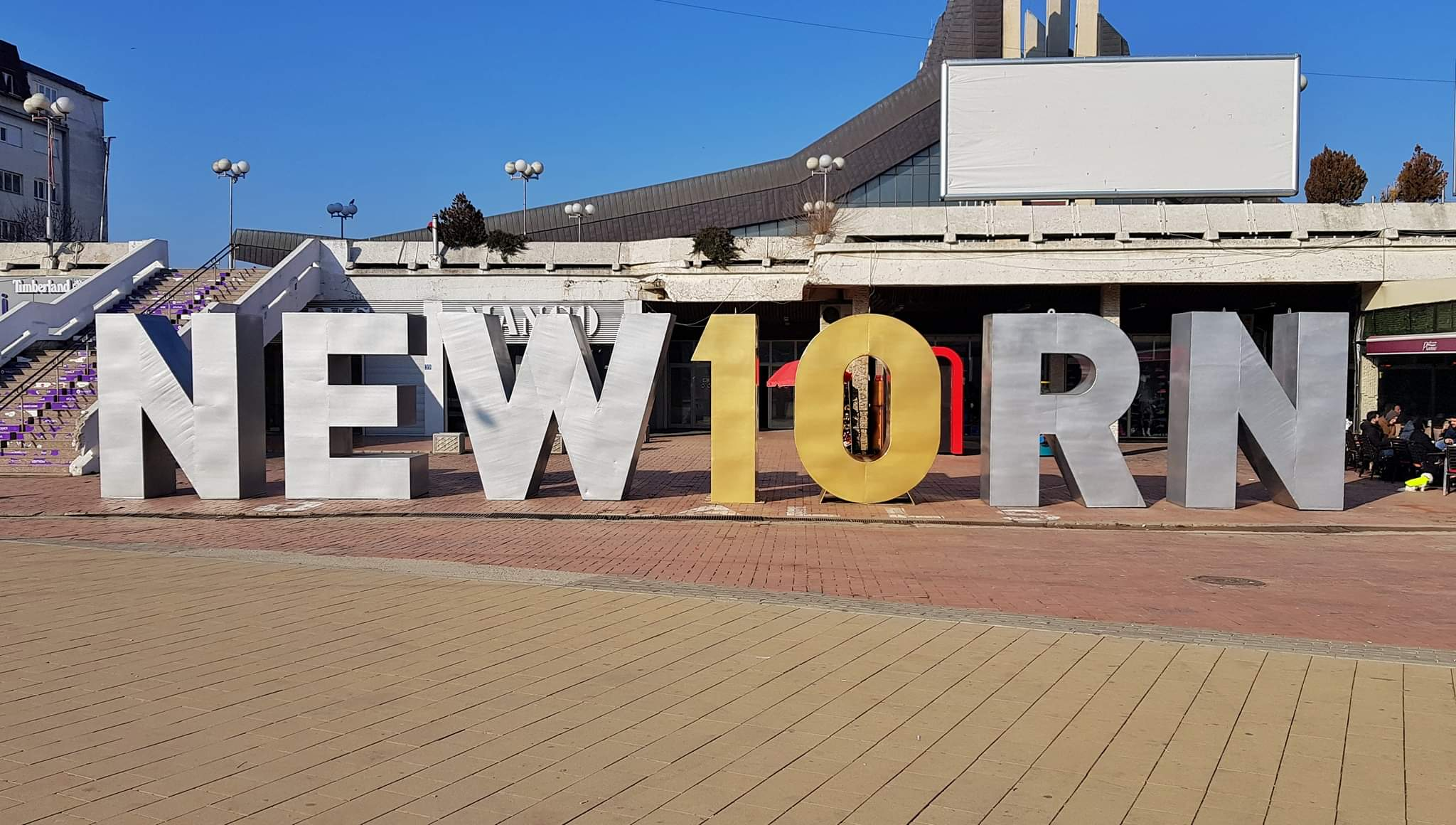
The Newborn monument in 2018, in commemoration of the tenth anniversary of the independence of Kosovo, with a "10" within the monument in place of the letters "BO"

Weighing in at 9 tons, Newborn's dimensions are 3.0 metres (10 ft) by 24 metres (79 ft) by 0.9 metres (3 ft), set in DIN Black typeface. Newborn was the first large public monument to commemorate Kosovo's independence. It was built in ten days of round-the-clock work.

"Newborn" was chosen as a single English word for the power to describe the birth of a new country, its positive connotations, ease of understanding by non-native English-speakers, and potential to present Kosovo as a new, contemporary, trendy country. The yellow color was chosen in combination with blue banners and the supporting slogans to represent both Kosovo's new flag colors as well as EU colors. The design was chosen for several reasons. It is a simple, easily understood and easily translated word with a variety of meanings. It represents the national pride that the people of Kosovo felt for earning their freedom and establishing themselves at the world’s newest state. The slogans that media outlets in Kosovo ran following the unveiling represent the plurality of meanings citizens found in the monument. These included: "NEW life is BORN", "NEW hope is BORN", "NEW future is BORN" and "NEW country is BORN".

== International acclaim ==
The monument with the flags (suggested by Enis Hyseni) has won prizes in six major international competitions in design category. Silver Clio Award was awarded at the 49th Clio Awards Festival for motivating human behavior in significant ways, the prestigious Cannes Gold Lion was awarded at the 55th Annual Cannes Lions International Advertising Festival, Eurobest European Advertising Festival Silver Award, Golden Drum Grand Prix, and LIA (London International Awards) finalist, all awarded in 2008, and The One Club Merit Award awarded in 2009. The re-painting of the monument was a selected finalist at the 54th Clio Awards Festival in 2013.

The design work has also been used in books to illustrate the design process and project concept development, as well as the use of FF DIN Typeface, although author of the typeface, Dutch designer Albert-Jan Pool, has stated multiple times that he condemns usage of his work in such circumstances.

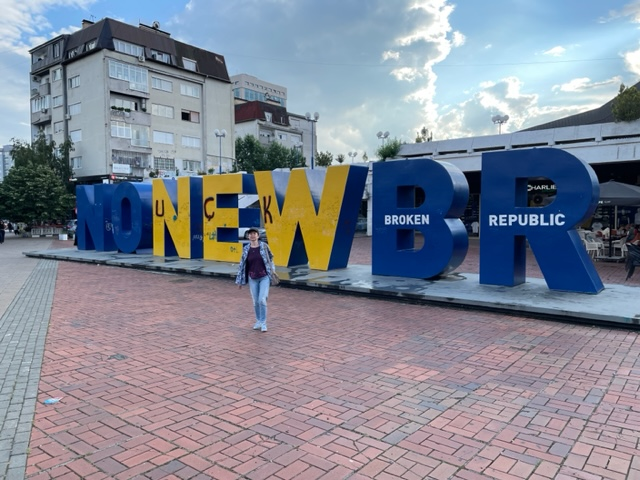
The Newborn monument with rearranged letters for "No New Broken Republic" in 2023

The sign has had some rearranging of its letters, as witnessed July 2023.

== See also ==
- Independence of Kosovo
- History of Kosovo
- National symbols of Kosovo
