= Parachute Typefoundry =

Greek type foundry

Parachute
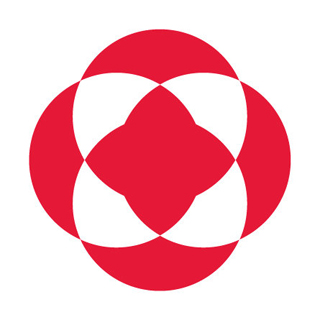
- Industry: Type foundry
- Founded: Athens, Greece, 2001
- Founders: Panos Vassiliou
- Headquarters: Athens, London
- Products: Fonts
- Website: parachutefonts.com

Parachute Typefoundry is a Greek type foundry company established in 2001.

Parachute offers a variety of fonts designed to support Latin, Cyrillic, and Greek scripts. Typefaces like PF Centro Pro, PF Champion Script Pro, and PF Goudy Initials Pro were introduced online in 2007.

In 2008, Parachute received a Gold award at the European Design Awards for its PF Centro type families designed by Panos Vassiliou. Subsequently, Parachute has achieved over 25 awards and distinctions, including the Red Dot: Grand Prix 2012.

In 2010, Parachute introduced PF DIN Text Arabic, the first Arabic version of the DIN typeface, created through a collaboration between Panos Vassiliou and Arab designer Hasan Abu Afash.

== Typefaces ==
- PF Bague
- PF Regal
- PF Centro
- PF DIN Text
- PF DIN Display
- PF Champion Script
- PF Beau Sans
- PF Square Sans
- PF Adamant
- PF Encore Sans
- PF Das Grotesk
- PF Handbook
- PF Fuel
- PF Occula
- PF Benchmark
- PF Monumenta

== Major Awards ==
Year	Award	Typeface
2016	Communication Arts Typography Competition Award Winner	Adamant Sans Pro
2015	Communication Arts Typography Competition Award of Excellence	Das Grotesk Pro
2014	Hiiibrand Typography Competition | Bronze Award	Bague Sans Pro
2014	Hiiibrand Typography Competition | Merit Award	Occula
2014	European Design Awards | Bronze	Bague Pro
2013	Hiiibrand Typography Competition | Silver Award	Regal Pro
2012	Red dot Design Awards | Grand Prix Winner	Regal Pro
2012	Communication Arts Typography Competition | Award of Excellence	Regal Pro
2011	Creative Review Type Annual | Winner	Regal Pro
2010	Granshan Awards | Excellence Award	Regal Pro, Champion Script Pro, Adamant Pro, Encore Sans Pro
2010	European Design Awards | Silver Winner	Encore Sans Pro
2009	International Type Design Competition | Excellence Award	Centro Pro, Champion Script Pro, Goudy Initials Pro and Goudy Ornaments
2008	European Design Awards | Gold Winner	Centro Pro
2004	EBGE Awards | Merit Award	Archive Pro
2002	EBGE Awards | Merit Award	Libera Pro, Manic Attack

== Publications ==
- YearBook of Type 2 – Germany – Niggli Verlag | 2016
- BranD magazine – China – October 2015 | Micro-forum
- Slanted 24 / Istanbul Issue – Germany – October 2014 | Square Sans
- Size-specific adjustments to type designs – Germany – Just Another Foundry | 2014
- New Graphic – China – Nanjing University of the Arts | 2014
- BranD magazine – China – November 2013 | Interview
- YearBook of Type – Germany – Niggli Verlag | 2013
- Slanted magazine / Babylon Issue – Germany – August 2013 | Regal
- The Briem Report: Letterforms 2012 – United States – Operina | 2013
- Understanding Type – United Kingdom – AVA Publishing | 2013
- Slanted magazine – Germany – September 2012 | Interview
- Page magazine – Germany – November 2011 | Schatten und Licht
- Type Navigator – Germany – Gestalten | 2011
- Arabesque 2 – Germany – Gestalten | 2011
- Page magazine – Germany – July 2011 | Typo-Objekte
- Computer Arts – United Kingdom – June 2011 | 150 fonts you can’t live without
- Quotation magazine – Japan – Spring 2011 | London, Tokyo, New York City, Berlin and more
- KAK magazine - Russia - Fall 2010 | European Design
- .Net magazine - United Kingdom - November 2010 | Top 20 Fonts for Web Design
- Page magazine - Germany - November 2010 | DIN Text Arabic
- Brush ’n’ Script - Germany - Verlag Hermann Schmidt Mainz | 2010
- Publish - Netherlands - Fall 2010 | Encore en Centro
- Typolyrics - Germany - Birkhäuser GmbH, Basel | 2010
- Computer Arts - United Kingdom - October 2009 | 114 pro Tips for Type
- 1000 Ideas by 100 Designers - Spain - Rockport Publishers | 2009
- Publish - Netherlands - Fall 2009 | DIN, FF, PF en Next
- Smashing magazine - Online - April 2009 | 30 Brilliant Typefaces for Corporate Design
- Smashing magazine - Online - March 2009 | Fantastic Typography Blogs for your Inspiration
- Novum - Germany - February 2009 | Parachute: Precision Landing
- Font magazine - Czech Republic - January 2009 | Interview
- Graphic Design Inspirations - Germany - Daab Publishing | 2008
- Visual Evasion - Online - December 2008 | 10 Best Typeface Designs of 2008
- Slanted - Germany - December 2008 | Fontnames Illustrated
- Typo - Czech Republic - Summer 2008 | Byzantine Ornaments
- Ministry of Type - Online - March 2008 | Champion Script Pro
- Slanted - Germany - September 2007 | Fontlabels, Fonts & Families
