= DIN 1451 =

Grotesque sans-serif typeface

- Category: Sans-serif
- Designer: Ludwig Goller
- Foundry: Deutsches Institut für Normung
- Date created: 1931
- Re-issuing foundries: FontFont, Linotype GmbH

DIN 1451 is a sans-serif typeface that is widely used for traffic, administrative and technical applications. It was defined by the German standards body DIN (Deutsches Institut für Normung, 'German Institute for Standardisation', pronounced like the English word din) in the standard sheet DIN 1451-Schriften ('typefaces') in 1931. Similar standards existed for stencilled letters.

Originally designed for industrial uses, the first DIN-type fonts were a simplified design that could be applied with limited technical difficulty. Due to the design's legibility and uncomplicated, unadorned design, it has become popular for general purpose use in signage and display adaptations. Many adaptations and expansions of the original design have been released digitally.

== Overview ==
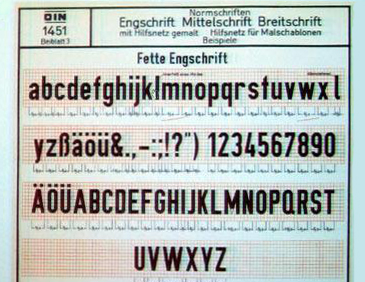
Early DIN-Fette Engschrift specimen. Fette Engschrift is a single weight of the DIN 1451 typeface.

The DIN 1451 typeface family includes both a medium (Mittelschrift) and a condensed (Engschrift) version; an older extended version (Breitschrift) has not been used since the early 1980s, but may still be encountered on older road signs in Germany. DIN 1451 is the typeface used on road signage in Germany and a number of other countries. It was also used on German car number plates from 1956 until January 1995, when it was replaced by FE-Schrift, a typeface that impedes tampering and aids optical character recognition for automatic number-plate recognition.

DIN 1451 has gained popularity due to its wide exposure through its release as a PostScript typeface in 1990. Since then, it is also used by non-governmental organisations and businesses. For graphic design and desktop publishing, several type foundries offer redesigned and extended versions of this typeface.

== History ==
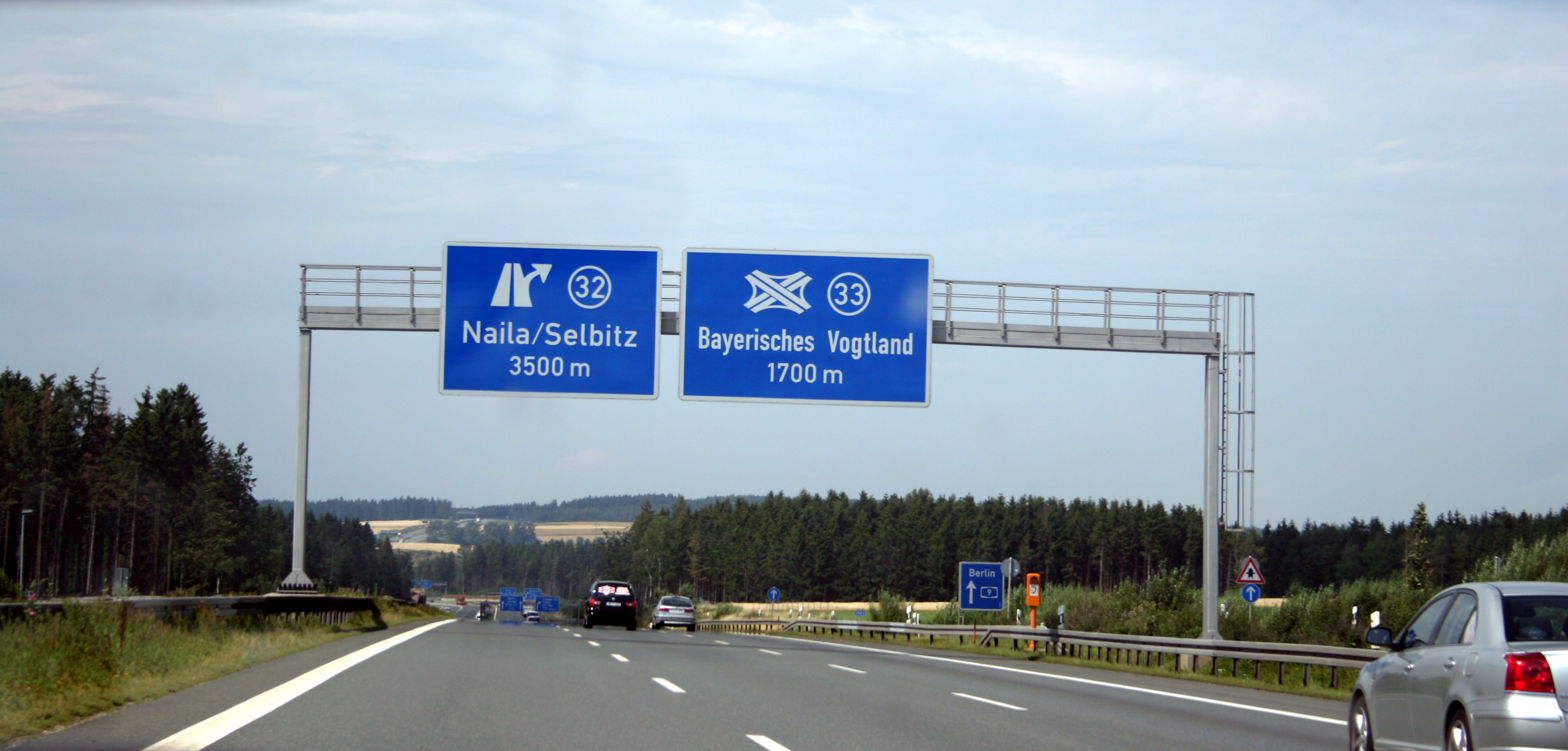
German road signs using both the DIN 1451 Mittelschrift (left) and Engschrift (right) typefaces

Speed limit sign using this typeface

In 1931, the DIN institute published DIN 1451. It contained several standard typefaces for mechanically engraved lettering, hand-lettering, lettering stencils and printing types. These were to be used in the areas of signage, traffic signs, wayfinding, lettering on technical drawings and technical documentation.

The origins of DIN 1451 Engschrift ('condensed face') for hand lettering date back to 1905, when the Prussian state railways prescribed a standardized lettering style for use on all of its rolling stock. This specification was published in a document known as Musterzeichnung ('master template', literally: 'pattern drawing') IV 44. Ten years later, the company – by then, renamed Prussian-Hessian Railways – additionally required that signage lettering on railway platforms and station premises also be rendered according to the 1905 master template. Then, as a byproduct of the 1920 consolidation of all German railway companies into the Deutsche Reichsbahn, the Prussian railway's typeface quickly became a de facto national standard, even before the DIN Committee of Typefaces took up its work on DIN 1451 a few years later. The DIN Committee of Typefaces was headed by the Siemens engineer, Ludwig Goller (1884–1964), who also led the central standardization office at Siemens & Halske in Berlin, between 1920 and 1945.

Signs at the town of Eisingen in Engschrift, Mittelschrift and Breitschrift
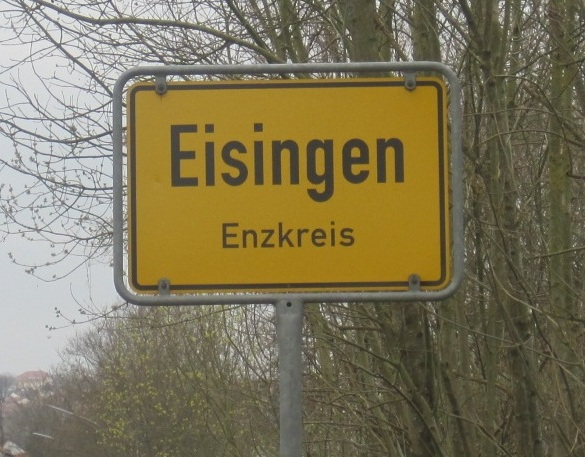
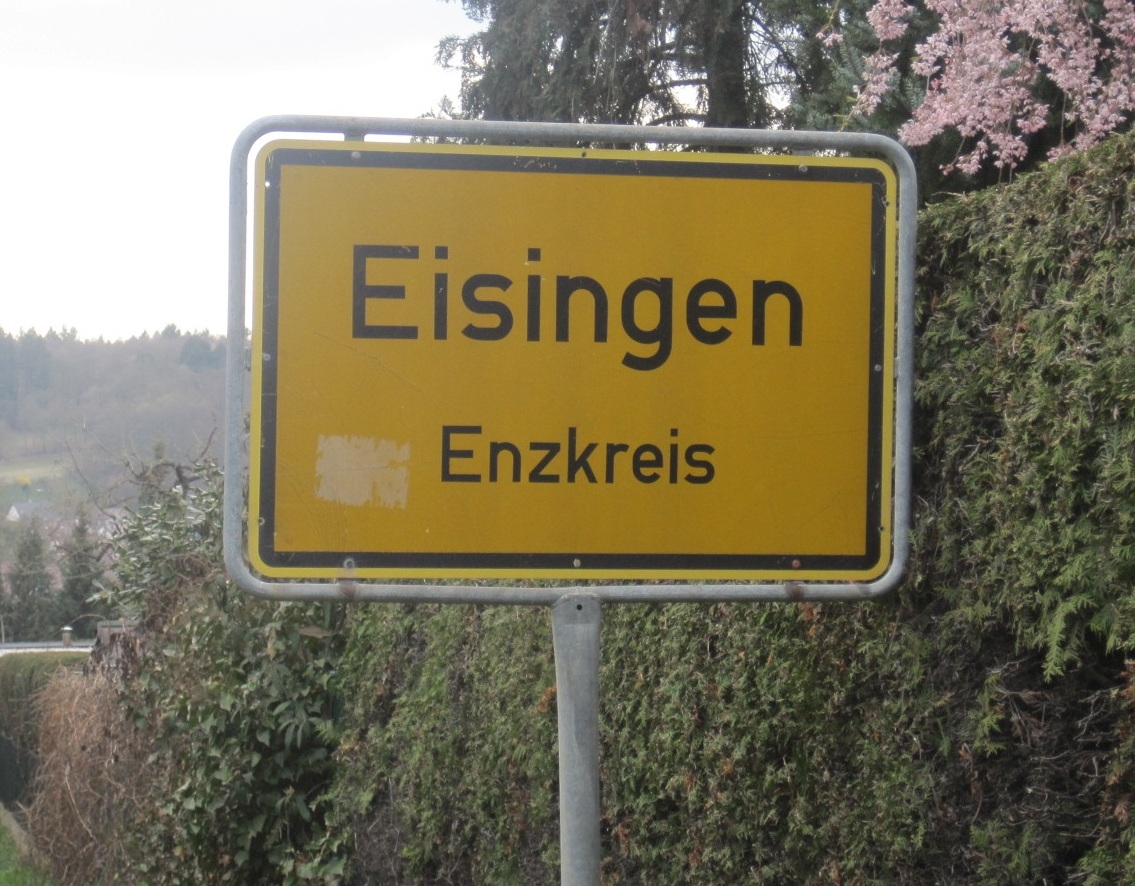
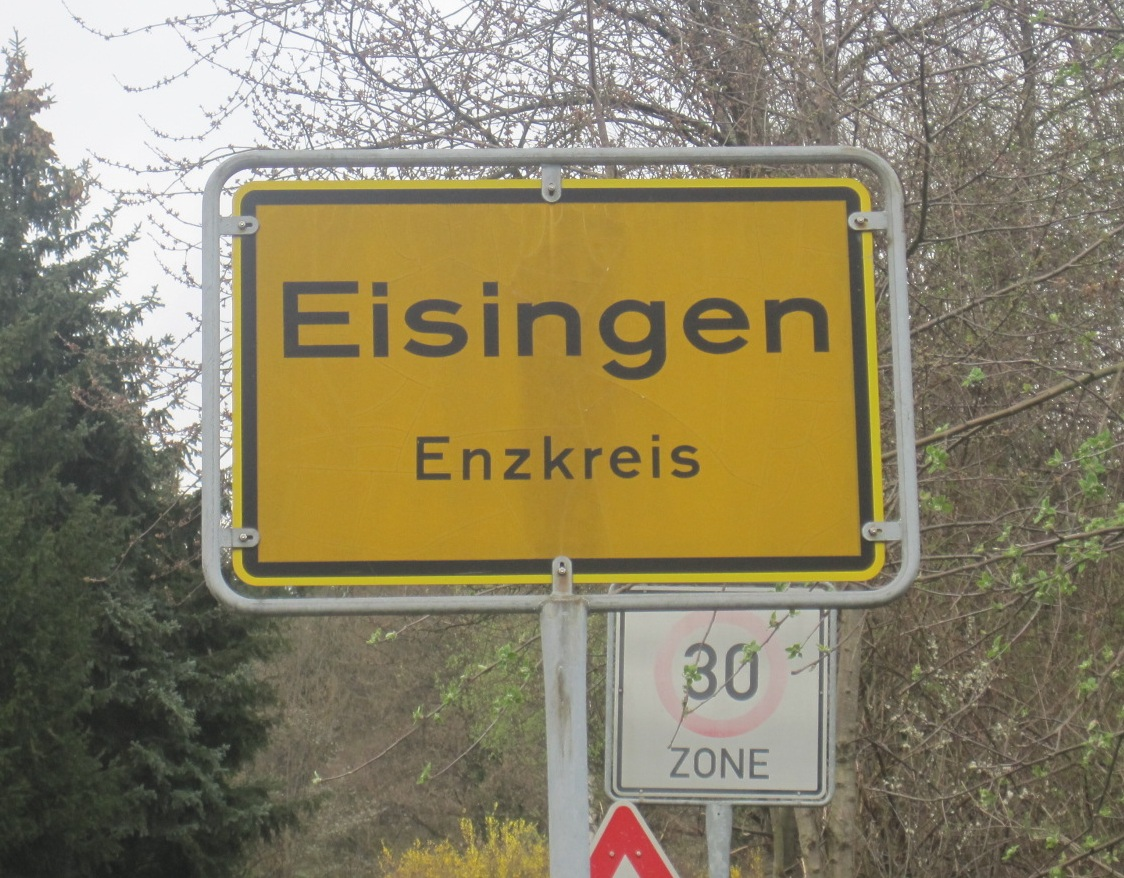

The design included not only the DIN Engschrift, but also a DIN Mittelschrift ('medium[-width] face' – now very popular). A DIN Breitschrift ('extended face') design was also included, but it has never been widely used.

In order to enable quick and easy reproduction, all drawings were originally based on a coarse grid and could be executed with compass and rulers. The Normblatt ('standards sheet') DIN 1451, Schriften ('typefaces') was released preliminarily in 1931; then, with some minor changes in 1936, it was released as an official standard. In 1938, Temporary Order No. 20 required DIN 1451 to be used on the new German Autobahn (motorway) system. Due to this and similar regulations, DIN 1451 still dominates German public lettering today.

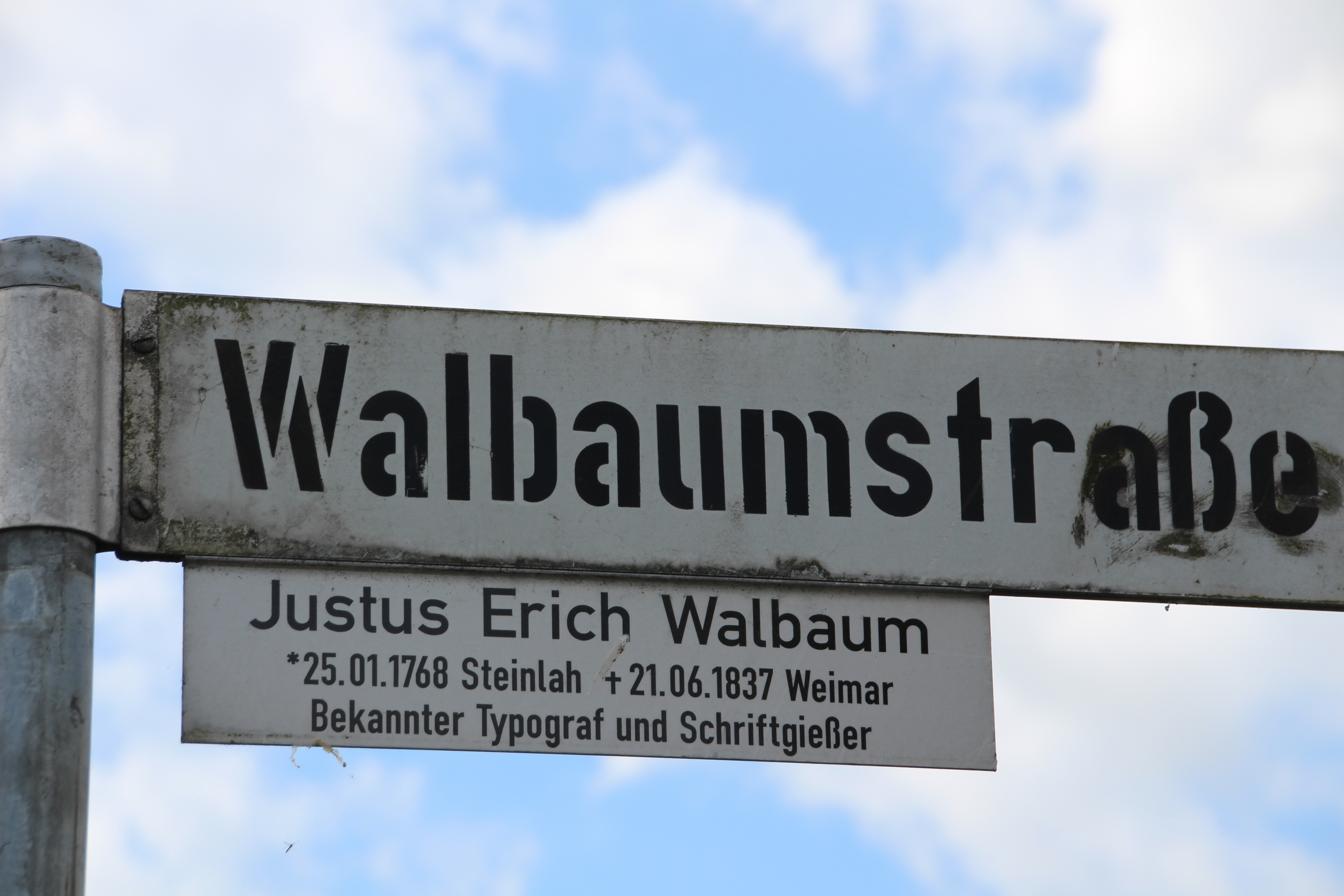
Stencilled and DIN-style lettering on a street sign in Steinlah, a district of Haverlah

In 1923, Stempel was the first type foundry to produce printing type according to a DIN Standard. The design follows DIN 16, an earlier standard for oblique lettering on technical drawings, which had been released in 1919. In 1929, the Berthold Type Foundry released a similar typeface. DIN 16 had also been made available as lettering templates engraved in celluloid material for drafting use by the Filler and Fiebig company in Berlin.

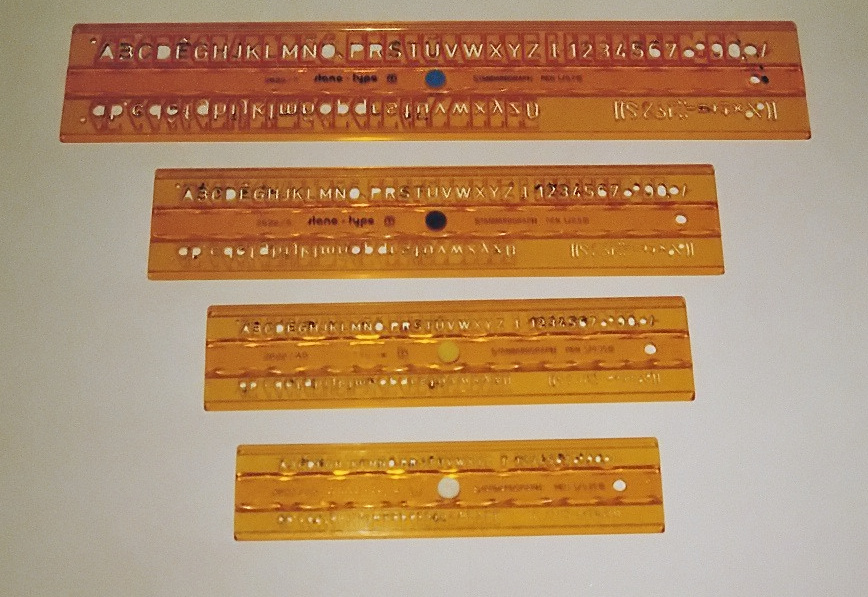
Stencils for lettering technical drawings to DIN standards

Within the scope of public and technical lettering, the use of the DIN 1451 typefaces spread rapidly once they were adopted. They were released as celluloid lettering stencils for smaller applications, as larger metal stencils for application to machinery, vehicles and airplanes, and as cast metal lettering for street and building signage; nevertheless, printing type conforming to DIN 1451 have never been produced. During World War II, DIN 1451 was also adopted in the Protectorate of Bohemia and Moravia. The 1943 version of DIN 1451 added a set of Cyrillic characters, although their design did not match the weight and proportions of DIN Mittelschrift.

Sans-serif lettering and typefaces styled around geometric shapes, along with Art Deco in general, was very popular in the 1920s and 1930s. At the Bauhaus, the use of coarse grids for designing typefaces was advocated by Herbert Bayer and Joost Schmidt during the Dessau period. Although of a similar design, the DIN typefaces did not incorporate the elegance of this stylistic trend.

Inspired by the DIN standard, a consortium of Dutch organisations created an equivalent lettering standard, NEN 3225. Created by a group of designers that included Jan van Krimpen, the design has no similarity to the DIN standard: it is a humanist family with serif and sans-serif styles. The sans-serif is similar to Gill Sans and to Johnston; the serif reflects the classical Renaissance humanist model. In a similar vein, the International Standards Organisation developed its own derivative, Isonorm, in 1980.

== Releases ==
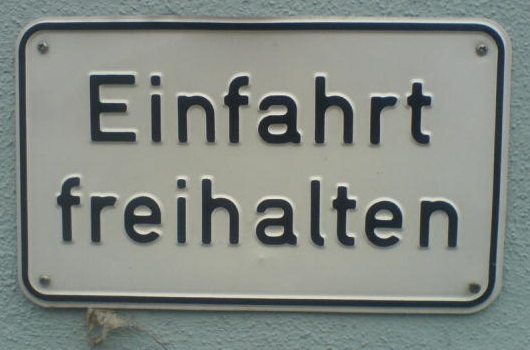
A sign in an older version of DIN Mittelschrift. Note the different structure of the 'a' and how curved strokes do not thin as they connect, as at the join of the 'h'.

The transferable-lettering-sheet company, Letraset made several variants available in the 1970s. Also, the Berthold type foundry adopted the DIN typefaces for their optomechanical phototype setting systems such as Staromat. In 1980, the DIN typefaces were redrawn by Adolf Gropp (1911–1996), a lettering artist from Frankfurt. The drawings were made on a finer grid. This enabled an exact definition of details such as the amount of overshoot of round characters (e.g. C, G and O) below the baseline and above the cap height. Also, characters such as S for which an accurate construction drawing had never been made were now defined using lines and arcs for the new cutting plotters that were to be used for the lettering on motorway signage. A number of the glyphs were changed, in particular those for "a", "6" and "9" as well as "t" in DIN Engschrift.

By the mid-1980s, Linotype adopted the redrawn DIN typefaces for digital photocomposition. Together with Adobe, they released it as DIN Mittelschrift and DIN Engschrift in 1990. Thus, the typefaces became part of the Adobe/Linotype PostScript typeface library. The use of DIN typefaces started to appear in the work of cutting edge graphic designers and design studios such as Uwe Loesch in Germany, Tel Design in the Netherlands, as well as David Carson and April Greiman in the USA. Soon, other leading designers began using DIN Mittelschrift and Engschrift, making it a popular option to other sans serif faces.

== Third-party adaptations ==
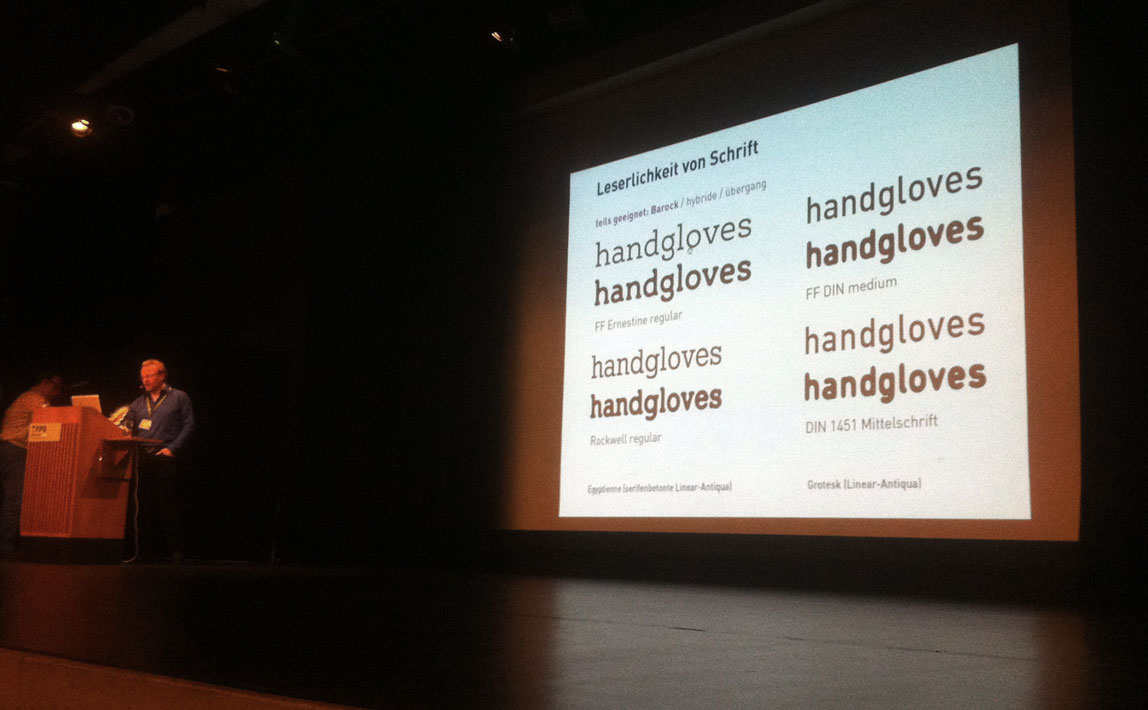
Albert-Jan Pool, author of one of the most famous adaptations of DIN, FF DIN, speaking about the design's history

With the popularity of the DIN fonts due their minimal and modern design, several designers and companies have released their own interpretations and adaptations, often adding new weights such as light or extra-bold, and italics, resulting in a range of digital interpretations.

=== Commercial ===
One of the most famous and best-selling digitisations of DIN is FF DIN (1995), created by Dutch typeface designer Albert-Jan Pool for FontFont. Typographica editor Stephen Coles has particularly praised it for the quality of its hinting for onscreen display. Users include the New York City Ballet, ETH Zurich, The Verge and the film The Wolf of Wall Street. Unlike the original design, it uses conventional weight names.

As the original DIN design is out of copyright, other companies have offered digital releases (or obtained rights to resell Linotype's). Parachute (Latin, Arabic, Cyrillic, Greek), Elsner+Flake, Paratype (with Cyrillic characters) and others have issued revivals of some DIN styles, often upgraded with additional weights. Fontsite renamed its release Fette 1451.

Microsoft created custom digitizations of both Mittelschrift and Engschrift versions of DIN 1451 in 2013, but this version was never released publicly. In 2016, a version was released as Bahnschrift, as Microsoft's first ever Open Type variable font. The Bahnschrift source was completely rebuilt from the ground up by Aaron Bell of Saja Typeworks and was expanded in weight, character set and manual hinting. It supports Latin, Cyrillic, Greek, currency symbols, and some Coptic. It was first included in Windows 10 version 1709, and is primarily being used as the user interface font for Xbox software.

Parachute Type Foundry also designed the PF DIN Max Variable typeface, which also based on the DIN 1451 typeface.

Emil Karl Bertell designed the Praktika typeface, inspired from the DIN 1451 typeface.

Thomas Schostok designed the CA BND typeface, inspired from the DIN 1451 typeface.

In 2023, the Berlin-based Type Foundry, Fontwerk released the Neue DIN typeface designed by Hendrik Weber, Andreas Frohloff and Olli Meier. Neue DIN is an interpretation of the DIN 1451 typeface and has an overall compact appearance with a range of extreme widths. It is variable first and provides 81 static fonts which correspond to W3C’s CSS specifications. Since September 2025, matching italics and left-leaning italics (‘Retalic’) have been available, increasing the number of static fonts to 243.

=== Open Source ===
Samples of various versions of lettering of DIN and related styles in digital format, mostly by Peter Wiegel

An extensive set of digitisations is made by Peter Wiegel with donations requested from users under the OFL. This includes the regular style (Mittelschrift) in two grades for printing with less and more ink spread, and the less well-known Breitschrift. He also digitised the rounded DIN 16 Oblique and DIN 17 Upright Standard Typeface for Drawings using the names TGL 0-16 and 0-17, the names under which they were known in the German Democratic Republic. Peter Wiegel also digitised a precursor of DIN 1451 typeface named Preussische IV 44 Ausgabe 3 typeface.

The Linux community had various DIN digitisation fonts released under various packages, including Open Din Schriften Engschrift (2009) and OSP-DIN (2011). Both are recreations based on the original DIN specifcation and licensed under OFL.

American cybersecurity and data backup company, Datto, Inc. released D-DIN at 2017, a typeface based on a variant of the DIN 1451 typeface as their corporate typeface and licensed from Monotype. The font contains regular, italic and bold variants with three widths and is also licensed under OFL; however the company has since stopped usage. Other derivatives from D-DIN include D-DIN-PRO, Altinn-DIN and DINish (additionally with variable font), which are all licensed under OFL under the license requirement.

Gidole is a DIN-inspired font licensed under OFL released in 2015. It includes variants in font weights and three alternate design styles (regular width, mono, Gidolinya with rounded corners). Google Fonts forked the repo in 2025 and rebuild only the Regular weight for their webfont service.

== See also ==
- Public signage typefaces
