= FF DIN =

Grotesque sans-serif typeface

DIN
- Category: Sans-serif
- Classification: Grotesque
- Designer: Albert-Jan Pool
- Foundry: FontShop International
- Date created: 1995
- Design based on: DIN 1451
- Variations: FF Din Arabic; FF Din Round; FF Din Slab; FF Din Stencil
- Sample

FF DIN is a sans-serif typeface in the industrial, or grotesque, style. It was designed in 1995 by Albert-Jan Pool, based on DIN-Mittelschrift and DIN-Engschrift, as defined in the German standard DIN 1451. DIN is an acronym for Deutsches Institut für Normung (German Institute of Standardisation). It was published by FontShop in its FontFont library of typefaces.

FF DIN has an unadorned appearance with high x-height and a large series of weights.

== History ==
At a 1994 meeting of the Association Typographique Internationale trade association in San Francisco, Pool encountered Erik Spiekermann, who encouraged him to design a revival of DIN 1451 for release by FontFont, the type foundry Spiekermann had just established.

While based on the DIN 1451 standard lettering, FF DIN has additional weights and a far wider character set. It includes ranging (old style) figures and several refinements that allow it to perform better as a print and screen text face. Spiekermann wrote in 2009 that "Albert's brief was to take the regular weight and subtly make it a good typeface. He did it so well that it looks exactly like the original, but much better, especially in smaller sizes. Albert also added weights...FF DIN looks as if DIN had always had those weights because Albert didn't let his ego interfere with the job."

The family includes five font weights in two widths, normal and condensed, each with italics. The entire family includes extended characters such as arrows, fractions, euro sign, lozenge, mathematical symbols, extra accented Latin letters, and superscript numeral figures. Alternate glyphs include rounded dots, old style figures, and alternate cedilla. With time Eastern European, Greek and Cyrillic character sets have been added as well.

== Distinctive characteristics ==
- Square dot with extra whitespace above the lower case i
- Rounded/extended shoulder of the lower case r
- Straight leg of the uppercase R
- Straight spur of the lower case a
- The geometric apostrophe with the bottom slant
- Lower-case l with a curl
- Slanted form is an oblique, rather than a true italic.
- Alternate characters: single-storey italic 'a', round dots.

== FF DIN Round ==
In summer 2010, FontFont introduced a completely new drawn round version called FF DIN Round, including five weights: light, regular, medium, bold, black. Assisted by Ivo Gabrowitsch of FontShop International, Albert-Jan Pool wrote a brochure named FF DIN Round – digital block letters. It provides additional information on both the design and the history of round sans serif typefaces. FF DIN Round Pro also includes a Cyrillic character set for all weights.
