= Albert-Jan Pool =

Dutch professional type designer (born 1960)

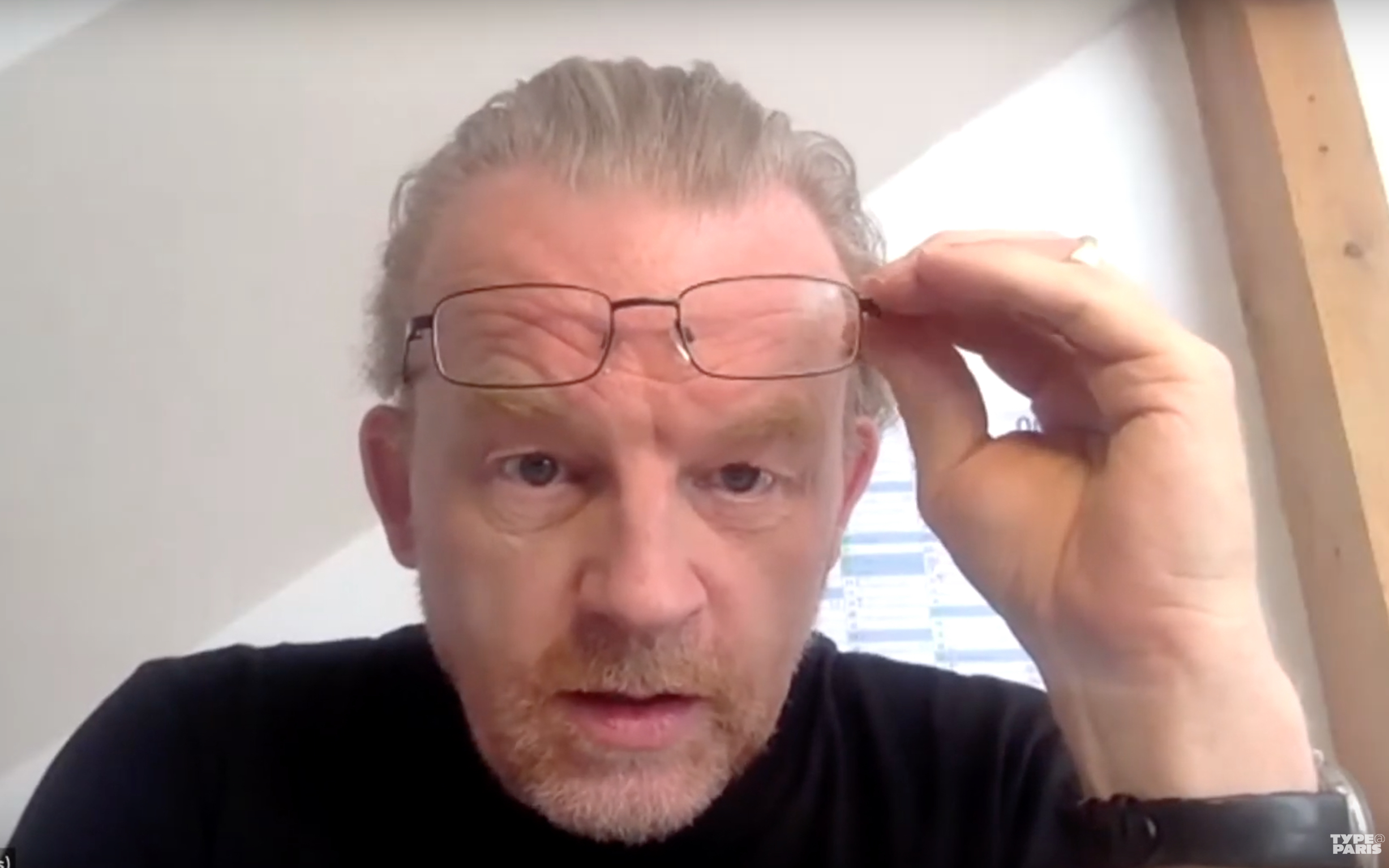
- Born: 1960 (age 65–66); Amsterdam, Netherlands
- Education: Royal Academy of Art, The Hague
- Employer: Muthesius Academy of Art
- Known for: type design

Albert-Jan Pool (born 1960) is a Dutch type designer and educator.

== Biography ==
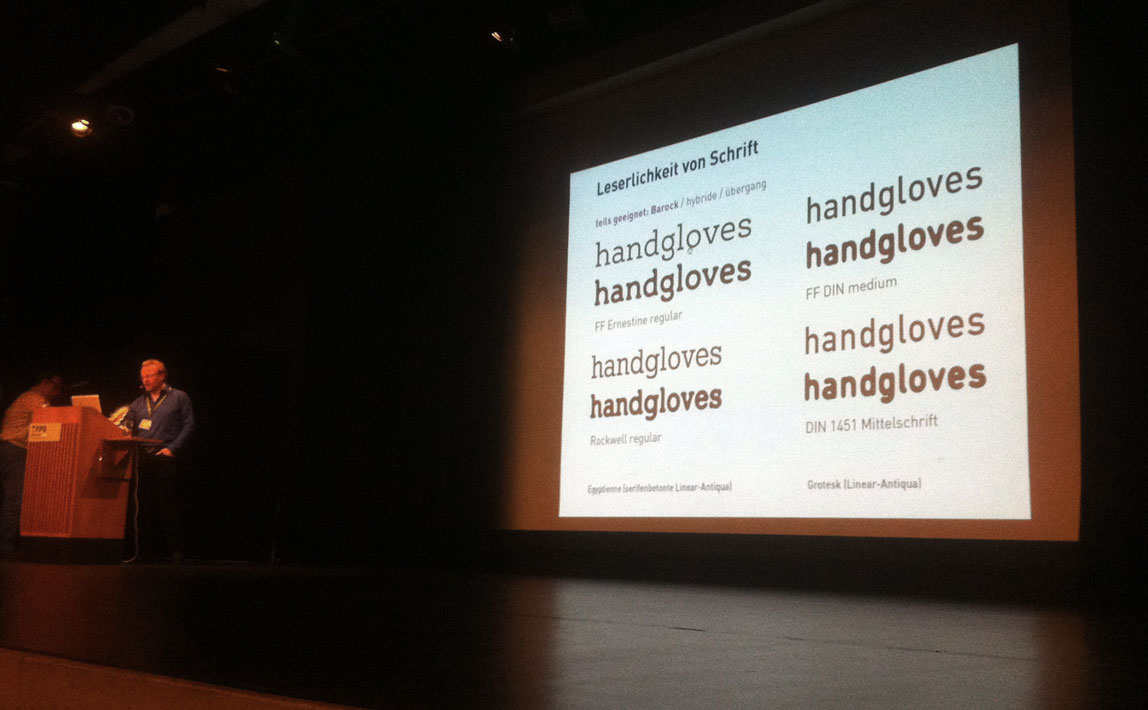
Albert-Jan Pool speaking on DIN in 2013

Albert-Jan Pool was born in 1960 in Amsterdam, Netherlands. He studied at the Royal Academy of Arts in The Hague.

After his study, he moved to Germany. From 1987 to 1991, he was Type Director at Scangraphic in Wedel, Germany. From 1991 to 1994, he was Manager of Type Design and Production at URW Type Foundry. During this time he completed his type families URW Imperial, URW Linear and URW Mauritius.

By January 1995, he started his own studio Dutch Design. FF DIN and FF OCR-F were among his first typeface design projects. He also created the Jet Set Sans, C&A InfoType, DTL HEIN GAS and HEM Headline corporate typefaces. In 2010 he extended his typeface family FF DIN with FF DIN Round and wrote ‘Digital Block Letters’ a small brochure on the history of round sans serif typefaces and the development of FF DIN Round, which was published by FontShop International in 2010.

In 1999, Pool co-founded the design agency FarbTon Konzept + Design. During his time with FarbTon he created the Regenbogen Bold typeface as well as DTL HeinGas Headline. He left FarbTon at the end of 2005.

By January 2006 he started publishing his findings on the history of the German standard typefaces as defined in DIN 1451. Since 2007 he is working on his doctoral thesis on the history of constructed sans serif typefaces in Germany, which is tutorized by prof. Gerard Unger of Leiden University.

He has been teaching type design at the Muthesius Academy of Art starting in 1995, as well as typography at the HAMM Hanseatische Akademie für Marketing und Medien (Hanseatic Academy for Marketing and Media) from 1996 to 1999.

In 2011, the New York Museum of Modern Art (MoMa) decided to extend its collection of applied arts by digital typefaces. Typeface FF DIN was amongst the first set of 23 typefaces which were collected by MoMa.

== Bibliography ==
Together with type-consultant Stefan Rögener and copywriter Ursula Packhäuser, he wrote and designed a book on the effects of typefaces on brand image entitled ‘Branding with Type’, which has been published by Adobe Press in 1995.

He has written a series of articles about the origins of the DIN typeface, published in the e-magazine 'Encore', issues 13–15, 17–18.

- Industrial Archeology – DIN, the first German Corporate Typeface?
- The Constructivist Connection – DIN, Bauhaus and the New Typography
- Siemens sets a Standard – DIN 1451 on its way up
- DIN for All: From the Economic Miracle to Art and Vernacular Typography – FF DIN: New at the Start
- How German is the DIN typeface? – Fahren, fahren, fahren at the Autobahn
