= Eduard Hoffmann (entrepreneur) =

Swiss engineer and type foundry director (1892–1980)

- Born: May 26, 1892; Zürich, Switzerland
- Died: September 17, 1980 (aged 88); Basel, Switzerland
- Resting place: Wolfgottesacker, Basel
- Occupations: Mechanical engineer, businessman
- Years active: 1917–1965
- Employer: Haas Type Foundry
- Known for: Initiating Helvetica (Neue Haas Grotesk)
- Spouse: Daisy Feer (m. 1926)
- Children: 3, including Alfred Hoffmann
- Parent: Eduard Hoffmann-Krayer (father)
- Relatives: Max Krayer (uncle)

Eduard Hoffmann (May 26, 1892 – September 17, 1980) was a Swiss mechanical engineer and businessman who led the Haas Type Foundry (Haas'sche Schriftgiesserei) in Münchenstein, near Basel. He is best known for initiating the sans-serif typeface Helvetica, first released as Neue Haas Grotesk, which Max Miedinger drew to his specifications starting in 1956.

Hoffmann joined the foundry in 1917 and ran it from 1944 until he retired in 1965. In 1971 he co-founded the Basler Papiermühle foundation, whose museum of paper, writing and printing opened in Basel in 1980.

== Biography ==
=== Early life and education ===
Hoffmann was born in Zürich on May 26, 1892, the son of the Germanist and folklorist Eduard Hoffmann-Krayer and Hedwig Hoffmann, née Krayer. In 1900 his father was appointed to a chair in German studies at the University of Basel, the first Swiss to hold one, and the family moved to Basel. Hoffmann passed his Matura at the humanist Gymnasium school in 1911. Drawn to the emerging field of aviation, he then studied engineering and mechanical engineering, with periods of study and internships in Zürich, Berlin and Munich. While in Munich he also developed an interest in the visual arts.

=== Career at the Haas Type Foundry ===
After serving as a corporal in the Swiss Army during the First World War, Hoffmann joined the Haas Type Foundry in 1917. The firm belonged to his uncle Max Krayer, and the job let him combine his engineering background with his artistic interests. The foundry moved to new premises in Münchenstein in 1921. It became a limited company in 1927, with the German foundries Stempel and Berthold as major shareholders. Hoffmann became co-director alongside Krayer in 1937, and after Krayer's death in 1944 he led the company alone until his retirement in 1965.

Although Hoffmann had trained as an engineer and not as a type designer, he took a close interest in the shapes of letters, which his son later linked to his interest in art and music. He often took ideas for new typefaces from historical models in the foundry's old specimen books. Under his direction, the foundry's in-house punchcutter Edmund Thiele produced typefaces such as Superba (1934) and revivals such as Nürnberger Schwabacher and a Caslon. From the postwar period the foundry also worked with outside designers, including Hermann Eidenbenz, whose Clarendon (1953) became an international success. Hoffmann paid particular attention to the foundry's type specimens and commissioned several well-known Swiss graphic designers to create them. More than a dozen typefaces were launched under his leadership. Typefaces the foundry developed with artists and designers during his time included Bodoni, Caslon, Superba, Diethelm-Antiqua, Clarendon and Helvetica, several of which sold well both in Switzerland and abroad.

In a 1960 article, Hoffmann attributed the success of the foundry's typefaces to a Swiss preference for sobriety and practicality.

=== Neue Haas Grotesk (Helvetica) ===
Neue Haas Grotesk typeface

Hoffmann decided around 1950 that Haas needed a new sans-serif typeface, but held off while the foundry's Normal-Grotesk was still selling. By 1956, Berthold's Akzidenz-Grotesk had become so popular with Swiss designers that imports of it far exceeded the Haas foundry's own turnover, and Hoffmann made a new sans-serif the foundry's top priority, knowing it would compete with Normal-Grotesk. After consulting Swiss graphic designers, including the advertising department of the Basel chemical company Geigy, he asked for a plain, understated design and commissioned Max Miedinger, a former Haas sales representative, to draw it. Hoffmann acted as art director, keeping a scrapbook in which he compared test proofs against Akzidenz-Grotesk, sending drafts to leading Basel designers for their opinions, and insisting that a single size be cut and tested in print before further weights were developed.

The typeface was launched as Neue Haas Grotesk at the Graphic 57 trade fair in Lausanne in June 1957. It quickly became the foundry's most successful typeface: by the summer of 1959 about 150 of Switzerland's roughly 1,600 printing firms had bought it, and the foundry's turnover had risen by about 20 percent over 1956. To bring it into machine typesetting, Hoffmann negotiated with Stempel, the foundry's majority shareholder, in 1959. He had deliberately developed the typeface without involving Stempel's partner Linotype, expecting that it would reject a new sans-serif at the planning stage but accept a finished one, and Linotype agreed to adopt it in July 1959. When Linotype judged the name Neue Haas Grotesk unsuitable for the German market and Stempel proposed Helvetia, Hoffmann suggested Helvetica instead, and the typeface became known worldwide under that name. He continued to promote it in Switzerland, commissioning Josef Müller-Brockmann to design a type sample book for advertising agencies in 1960 and writing a series of articles about the typeface for Typografische Monatsblätter between 1958 and 1961. In the 1961 article he explained the thinking behind the design, arguing that a plain grotesque was harder to design well than a more individual typeface, and closed by warning against using sans-serifs for everything. Helvetica is generally credited jointly to Miedinger and Hoffmann, who conceived the typeface and directed its design.

=== Later life ===
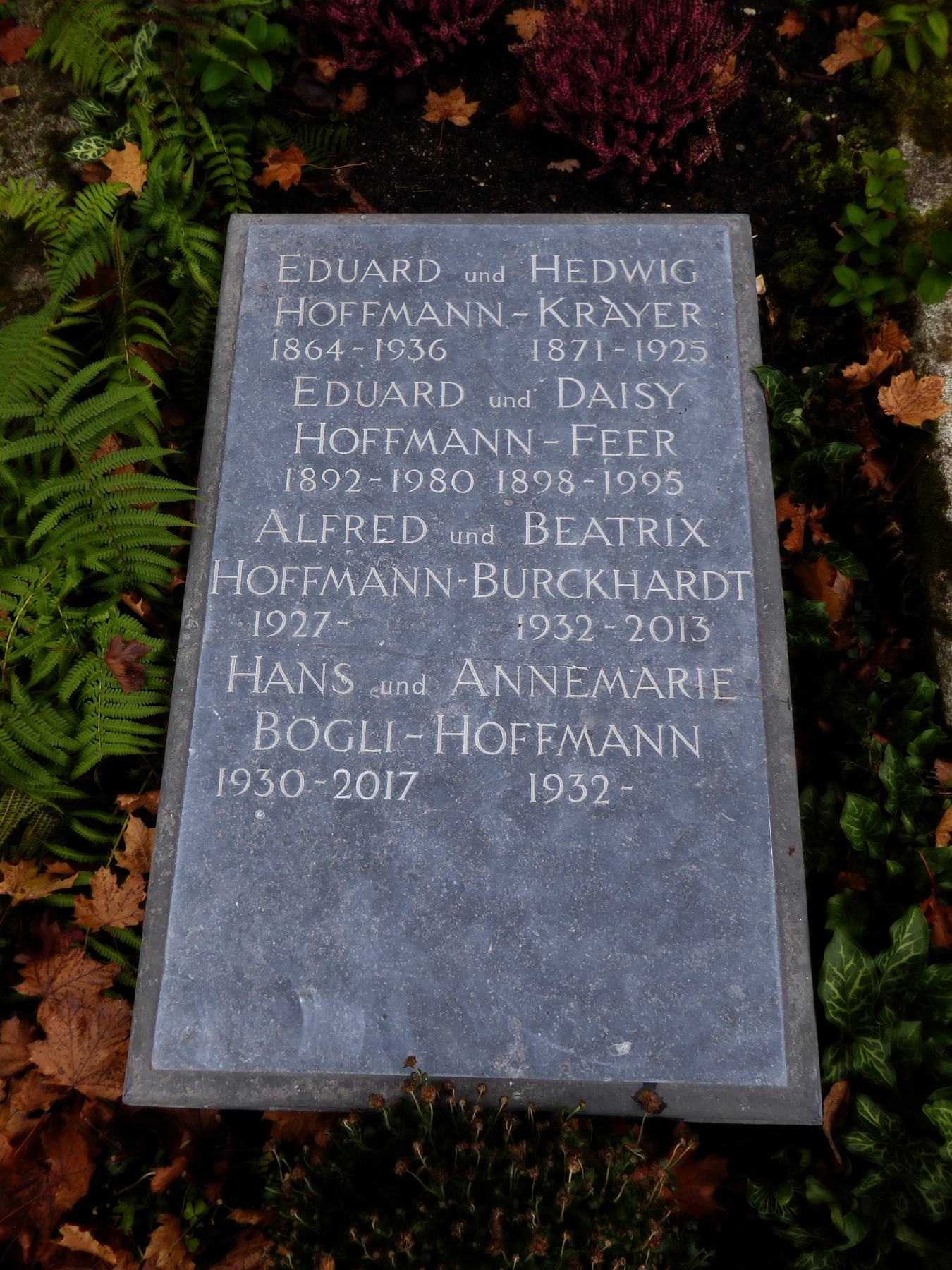
Family grave in the Wolfgottesacker cemetery, Basel

Outside the foundry, Hoffmann was active in charitable and cultural organizations, including the Association for Infant Welfare (Verein für Säuglingsfürsorge). He was secretary of the Association for the Historical Museum of Basel (Verein für das Historische Museum Basel) and a member of the Society for Folklore (Gesellschaft für Volkskunde).

In 1971, together with the paper chemist W. Fritz Tschudin and the historian Albert Bruckner, Hoffmann founded the Basler Papiermühle foundation (Stiftung Basler Papiermühle) to create a museum of the printing crafts. On the occasion of his 80th birthday in 1972, the Haas foundry donated the historical collection he had assembled in its "Wilhelm-Haas-Stube" to the foundation. The museum, the Basel Paper Mill, opened in 1980 in the former Gallician mill in Basel's St. Alban valley, shortly after Hoffmann's death. His collection of records on the history of the Haas foundry became one of its core holdings.

Hoffmann died in Basel on September 17, 1980, and is buried in the family grave at the Wolfgottesacker cemetery.

=== Personal life ===
In 1926 Hoffmann married Daisy Feer; they had two sons and a daughter. His son Alfred E. Hoffmann (born May 14, 1927) trained at the Haas foundry and then worked for a printing firm in New York. He returned to Basel in 1951 to assist his father, became vice-director in 1959 and director in 1968, and was in charge of selling foundry type and licensing the foundry's typefaces worldwide. He stayed until the foundry closed in 1989.

== Selected writings ==
- Hoffmann, Eduard (April 1960). "Das Schriftschaffen der Haas'schen Schriftgießerei Münchenstein/Basel seit dem Jahre 1924" [Type production at the Haas Type Foundry, Münchenstein/Basel, since 1924]. Typografische Monatsblätter (in German). 79 (4): 217–220.
