= Helvetica =

Neo-grotesque sans-serif typeface

- Category: Sans-serif
- Classification: Neo-grotesque
- Designers: Max Miedinger; Eduard Hoffmann
- Foundry: Haas'sche Schriftgiesserei
- Date released: 1957
- Re-issuing foundries: Stempel; Linotype
- Design based on: Akzidenz-Grotesk
- Variations: Helvetica Inserat; Helvetica Compressed; Neue Helvetica; Helvetica Now; Others (see below)
- Also known as: Neue Haas Grotesk
- Shown here: Neue Helvetica
- Metrically compatible with: Arial; Arimo; Liberation Sans

Helvetica, originally named Neue Haas Grotesk, is a widely used sans-serif typeface designed in 1956–1957 by the Swiss typeface designer Max Miedinger under the direction of Eduard Hoffmann, head of the Haas Type Foundry in Münchenstein, near Basel, Switzerland.

Helvetica is a neo-grotesque design based chiefly on the 1890s typeface Akzidenz-Grotesk. It has a high x-height, strokes that end on horizontal or vertical lines, and tight letter spacing, which give it a dense, solid appearance. Haas developed it to compete with Akzidenz-Grotesk in the Swiss market, during a revival of interest in grotesque sans-serifs that also produced Adrian Frutiger's Univers.

In 1959 the typeface was adapted for Linotype typesetting machines and renamed Helvetica, Latin for "Swiss", at Hoffmann's suggestion; the name also drew on Switzerland's reputation as a center of modern graphic design. It became a hallmark of the International Typographic Style and one of the most popular typefaces of the mid-20th century, and its inclusion as a core PostScript font in the 1980s secured its place in digital typesetting. Many variants have since been released, including Neue Helvetica (1983) and Helvetica Now (2019).

== History ==
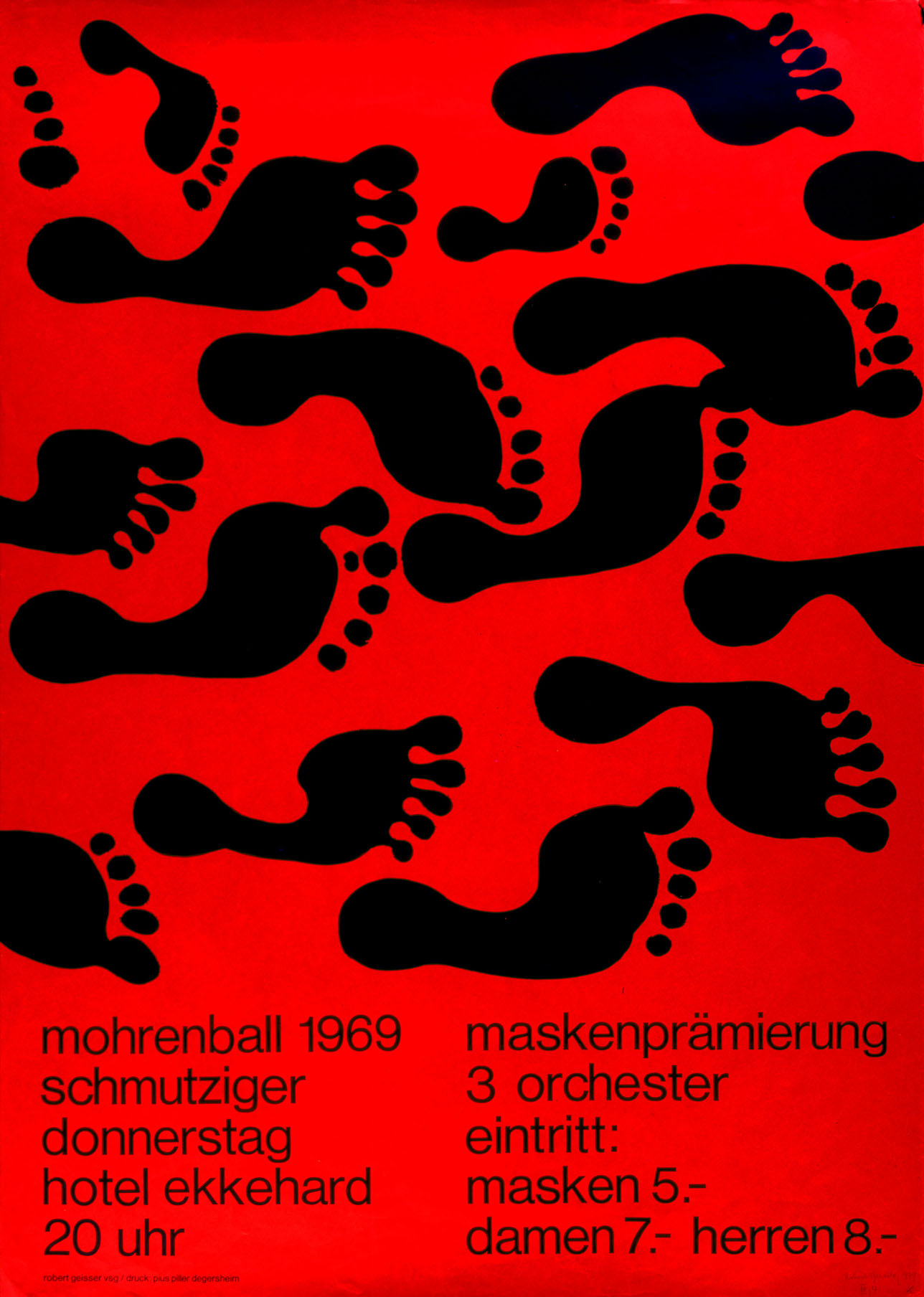
A 1969 poster by Robert Geisser exemplifying the "Swiss" style of the 1950s and 60s: solid red color, simple images, and neo-grotesque sans-serif type, all in lowercase. This design appears to use Helvetica or a close imitation.

=== Background ===
Sans-serif types originated in England in the early 19th century. William Caslon IV issued one in 1816, but it was the heavier designs of Vincent Figgins and William Thorowgood that caught on, and by the late 19th century "grotesques" were in use worldwide. Many looked alike because a single Leipzig firm, Wagner & Schmidt, cut matrices for numerous foundries, each of which sold the result under its own name. In the 1920s geometric designs such as Erbar, Kabel and Futura came into fashion, though Jan Tschichold favored the plainer older grotesques such as Akzidenz-Grotesk. With German type design largely halted by the Second World War, the older grotesque tradition was carried forward in Switzerland, where by the early 1950s such typefaces were increasingly marketed as "neutral". Older sans-serif families had often grown weight by weight over decades and varied considerably from one weight to the next, whereas designs of the late 1950s such as Helvetica were planned for a consistent texture across the family.

=== Development (1950–1957) ===
The first version of the typeface was designed in 1956 by Max Miedinger with art direction by Eduard Hoffmann. Hoffmann, director of the Haas Type Foundry, had considered introducing a new sans-serif from about 1950, but postponed the project because the foundry's own Normal-Grotesk of 1943 continued to sell and because printers were reluctant to buy another complete range of costly metal type. By 1956 Berthold's Akzidenz-Grotesk had become the preferred sans-serif of Swiss designers, and imports of it greatly exceeded the Haas foundry's own sales. Hoffmann then decided to proceed. His goal was to create a new sans serif typeface that could compete in the Swiss market as a neutral face that should not be given any additional meaning. The primary influence on Helvetica was Akzidenz-Grotesk from Berthold; Hoffmann's scrapbook of proofs of the design shows careful comparison of test proofs with snippets of Akzidenz-Grotesk. Its 'R' with a curved tail resembles Schelter-Grotesk, another turn-of-the-century sans serif sold by Haas. Wolfgang Homola comments that in Helvetica, "the weight of the stems of the capitals and the lower case is better balanced" than in its influences.

Hoffmann developed the brief in consultation with Swiss graphic designers, including the advertising department of the Basel chemical company Geigy. The design was to be a plain, unornamented grotesque rather than a more individual sans-serif in the manner of Futura or Gill Sans. Hoffmann named three existing typefaces as reference points: the semi-bold weight of Akzidenz-Grotesk, the 1890 Schelter-Grotesk (sold by Haas as French Grotesk) and Normal-Grotesk. Miedinger, a former Haas sales representative then working as a freelance designer in Zürich, began work in the fall of 1956 with a 20-point semi-bold. The development is documented in detail in the two men's correspondence. On October 5, 1956, Miedinger sent Hoffmann his first capitals, drawn about 9.4 centimeters tall for photographic reduction and made slightly heavier than the three reference typefaces, together with a list of corrections he still intended to make. He noted that he had kept the design slightly narrow so that printers would not find it too wide for text, and proposed giving the regular weight the same widths as the bold so that both could later be set on typesetting machines. Hoffmann replied the next day that several capitals were still unsatisfactory, but asked him first to complete the test word "Hamburgers", which he wanted to compare closely with Akzidenz-Grotesk and to show to Fritz Bühler, who worked for Ciba and whose approval, like that of Geigy's designers, he considered important to the typeface's prospects. At the end of December Miedinger proposed beginning the regular weight and a four-page brochure for the Graphic 57 trade fair, but Hoffmann asked him to wait until one size of the semi-bold had been cut, cast and tested in print, adding that no more than two sizes could be ready for the fair.

The design was refined through correspondence during the spring of 1957. On Miedinger's recommendation, Hoffmann accepted closer letter spacing than traditional foundry practice, which linked the space between letters to the space between the stems of the 'm'. He also compared the design with Folio, a new sans-serif from the Bauer Type Foundry. Hoffmann approved a final sample on May 7, 1957, but revisions continued for several months, and the lowercase 'a' reached its final form only after the public launch.

=== Launch and Swiss success (1957–1959) ===
The typeface was first shown at Graphic 57, an international exhibition of the printing industry held in Lausanne from June 1 to 16, 1957, on a stand designed by Miedinger. Deberny & Peignot presented Adrian Frutiger's Univers at the same exhibition; Frutiger had previously shown the project to Hoffmann, and the two typefaces became long-standing competitors. After the exhibition Hoffmann promoted the typeface to the advertising departments of Basel's chemical companies, where Geigy's designers rated it above Akzidenz-Grotesk. By March 1958 the semi-bold was available in ten sizes from 6 to 36 point, and the regular and bold weights were completed that summer. Promotional leaflets were designed by Miedinger, by Fritz Bühler with Walter Bosshardt, and by Albert Gomm. By the summer of 1959 about 150 of Switzerland's approximately 1,600 printing firms had bought the typeface. Over the same period Swiss imports of metal type fell by about two-thirds, and the foundry's annual turnover rose by about a fifth over 1956, to nearly 2.5 million Swiss francs.

=== Machine typesetting and renaming (1959–1960) ===
Akzidenz-Grotesk and Monotype Grotesque nevertheless remained dominant in Swiss machine composition. In June 1959 Hoffmann traveled to Frankfurt to negotiate with Stempel, which had held a majority shareholding in Haas since 1954 and manufactured the matrices for Linotype typesetting machines. Stempel's sales manager Heinz Eul had independently recommended the typeface, and Stempel agreed to adapt it for Linotype machines. The adaptation required every character to be redrawn for machine matrices, and Stempel objected that Linotype had not been consulted earlier. Hoffmann had deliberately withheld the project from Linotype until it was complete, believing that the company, which already sold several sans-serifs and served a German market then favoring serif and calligraphic designs, would have rejected a new grotesque at the planning stage. Walter Fisch, the Haas sales representative, helped persuade Linotype's director Rudolf Hörter by providing a list of more than sixty Swiss printers interested in a machine version, and Linotype confirmed its agreement at the end of July 1959. Attracting considerable attention on its release as Neue Haas Grotesk (Nouvelle Antique Haas in French-speaking countries), (Note: "Antique" is a term used in French for sans-serifs (for instance Antique Olive), although in English it traditionally historically referred to slab-serifs.) the typeface was adopted by Stempel and Linotype for hot metal composition, the standard typesetting method at the time for body text, and for the international market.

Linotype considered the name Neue Haas Grotesk unsuitable for the German market. Eul proposed Helvetia, the Latin name for Switzerland, but Hoffmann objected that the name was already used by a sewing machine manufacturer and an insurance company, and suggested Helvetica ("Swiss") instead. Stempel adopted the proposal, and Hörter, who was concerned that the name might seem nationalistic abroad, eventually agreed. The name derives from the pre-Roman tribes of what became Switzerland. Linotype matrices for the first text sizes, 6, 8 and 10 point, were issued in 1960. Initially only the machine version was called Helvetica; the hand-set type cast by Haas continued to be sold in Switzerland as Neue Haas Grotesk for several years. For the Linotype version, Stempel's punchcutter Arthur Ritzel slightly reduced the height of the capitals so that accented capitals would match them, and adjusted the spacing of the regular and bold weights.

=== Expansion and international adoption (1960s) ===
Intending to match the success of Univers, Ritzel redesigned Neue Haas Grotesk into a larger typeface family. At Haas, an italic begun by Miedinger in January 1959 was released in early 1961. The foundry expanded the range further by renaming typefaces already in its catalog: the bold of Normal-Grotesk became Helvetica Black Expanded, and two weights of Commercial Grotesk, a 1940 sans-serif derived from the slab-serif Superba, became Helvetica Bold Condensed and Helvetica Black Condensed. A black italic, begun in 1964 and completed in 1965, was drawn by Alfred Gerber, a junior Haas employee, rather than by Miedinger. At Stempel, Ritzel began work on the regular and bold weights for Linotype in February 1960 and on the italic in 1961, redrawing Miedinger's italic forms for machine use. Condensed, extended and bold condensed styles based on the Haas versions followed in 1964, and from 1965 Werner Schimpf, who later succeeded Ritzel, designed a light weight and its italic. Outline, rounded, contour and shaded styles and a Cyrillic version (1972) were added later. Because the American point system differs from the European Didot system, Stempel also modified the matrices for American Linotype machines, and Helvetica became available in North America in 1963.

In Switzerland, Hoffmann promoted the typeface in a series of articles in Typografische Monatsblätter published between 1958 and 1961, and in 1960 he commissioned Josef Müller-Brockmann to design a type sample book for advertising agencies, which often determined the choice of typeface for printed work. The Haas sales representative Walter Fisch promoted it to Swiss printers, but early sales were slow: in Basel, Emil Ruder and Rudolf Hostettler, editor of Typografische Monatsblätter, campaigned for Univers instead. Swiss opinion divided largely along regional lines, with Zürich designers associated with the magazine Neue Grafik, including Müller-Brockmann and Hans Neuburg, supporting the Haas design; Neuburg reviewed it favorably in December 1959.

Demand soon outgrew Haas's capacity, and Stempel began casting part of the range under license in Frankfurt, eventually producing more of the typeface than Haas itself. In Germany it was promoted by Stempel's artistic director Erich Schulz-Anker and sales manager Heinz Eul, and in the United States by Mike Parker of Mergenthaler Linotype. By 1963 the name Helvetica had replaced Neue Haas Grotesk in Switzerland. The typeface's success also led competitors to adapt their own designs; Monotype, for example, redrew around twelve characters of its Grotesque 215 to resemble Helvetica.

Corporate identity programs contributed substantially to Helvetica's international adoption. Otl Aicher and his Entwicklungsgruppe 5 at the Ulm School of Design used the semi-bold weight for Lufthansa's corporate identity in 1962. In 1967 Massimo Vignelli selected Helvetica as the corporate typeface of American Airlines, and Henrion Design Associates adopted it for British European Airways. BASF and the furniture manufacturer Knoll were among its other early corporate users.

The design was popular: Paul Shaw suggests that Helvetica "began to muscle out" Akzidenz-Grotesk in New York City from around summer 1965, when Amsterdam Continental, which imported European typefaces, stopped pushing Akzidenz-Grotesk in its marketing and began to focus on Helvetica instead. It was also made available for phototypesetting systems, as well as in other formats such as Letraset dry transfers and plastic letters, and many phototypesetting imitations and knock-offs were rapidly created by competing phototypesetting companies. Early phototypeset versions tended to round off the angles where strokes met, a problem Ritzel addressed by slightly deepening those junctions in the artwork.

=== Licensing and later history ===
Under the licensing arrangements, Linotype held the exclusive right to sell Helvetica for typesetting machines and paid Haas relatively low royalties. It did not permit Haas to license the design to competing machine manufacturers without compensation, and Haas was able to license it only to makers of photographic headline-setting equipment, although its royalties from dry-transfer and adhesive-letter manufacturers such as Letraset increased from 1965. Competing manufacturers therefore frequently offered imitations of the design instead. Haas responded with Haas Unica, a revised design for phototypesetting created in 1977 by André Gürtler, Christian Mengelt and Erich Gschwind, whose name combines "Univers" and "Helvetica"; Linotype added it to its own library only in 1987. Linotype's attitude changed in the 1980s, when licensing typefaces became an important source of income; it acquired Stempel in 1985 and Haas in 1989, when the Haas foundry closed and Linotype, as majority shareholder, took over the rights to its typefaces.

In the 1970s and 1980s, Linotype licensed Helvetica to IBM, Xerox, Adobe, and Apple, guaranteeing its importance in digital printing by making it one of the core computer fonts of the PostScript page description language. The phototype and digital versions were derived from the 12-point metal type. This led to a version being included on Macintosh computers, with Arial (a metrically compatible clone) included with Microsoft Windows computers. The rights to Helvetica are now held by Monotype Imaging, which acquired Linotype; the Neue Haas Grotesk digitization (discussed below) was co-released with Font Bureau.

== Characteristics ==
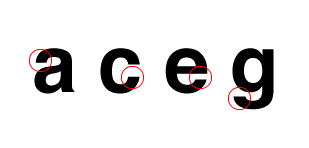
Helvetica's tight apertures contribute to a regular, dense design.

Helvetica has a tall x-height, tight spacing between letters, and wide capitals of fairly uniform width, most noticeable in the 'E' and 'F'. Like almost all grotesque and neo-grotesque typefaces, it has an oblique rather than a true italic style. Other distinguishing details include a square-looking 's', a bracketed flag at the top of the '1', a rounded square tail on the 'R', a concave curved stem on the '7', a two-story 'a' with curves in both the bowl and the stem, and a single-story 'g'.

Eduard Hoffmann described several of the design's intentions in a 1961 article. The wider letters, such as a, m, M and W, were slightly thinned on their inner sides to prevent them from printing too heavily, and the capitals avoided the thick-and-thin contrast of pen-drawn letters. The forms were meant to look drawn rather than geometrically constructed, with round counters in letters such as b, d and p. The large x-height was intended to aid readability; the figures were made shorter than the capitals, and the g was positioned slightly above the baseline. To settle the letter spacing, four widths were tested on the word "Hamburger" and the third was selected.

Helvetica can't do everything...it can be really weak in small sizes. Shapes like 'C' and 'S' curl back into themselves, leaving tight "apertures"—the channels of white between a letter's interior and exterior... The lowercase 'e', the most common letter in English and many other languages, takes an especially unobliging form. These and other letters can be a pixel away from being some other letter.

— Tobias Frere-Jones

Like many neo-grotesque designs, Helvetica has narrow apertures, which limit its legibility on screen and at small print sizes. It also has no visible difference between uppercase 'I' and lowercase 'l', although the numeral '1' is reasonably distinguishable by the flag at its top left. Its tight, display-oriented spacing may also reduce legibility in text.

== Variants ==
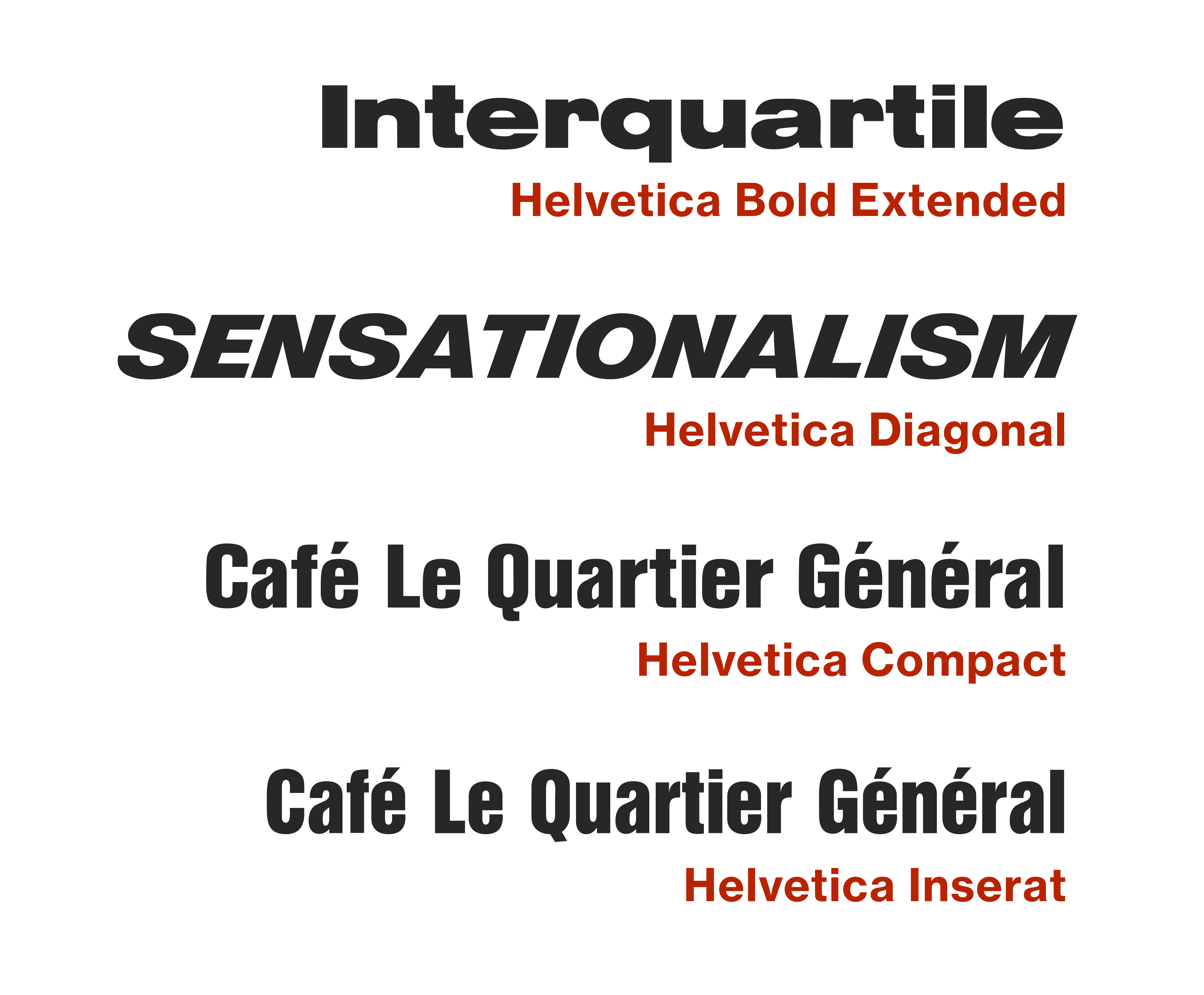
A number of unusual adaptations of Helvetica have been released that diverge from Miedinger's original design, notably the Bold Extended weight in which the 'r' has a droop, the extra-slanted Diagonal weight, Helvetica Compact with a different 'Q' and straight-sided capitals, and the extra-condensed, high x-height Inserat.

Many variants of Helvetica were released to build on its popularity, including new weights, widths, and versions for other scripts. The earliest additions were made by Haas and Stempel in the early 1960s. Because the family grew piecemeal rather than to a single plan, Linotype acknowledged in a 1976 advertorial that the series was less uniform than Univers.

=== Helvetica Light (1965) ===
Comparison of distinguishing characters in Akzidenz-Grotesk, Folio, Helvetica, and Univers 55

Sources differ over the design of Helvetica Light. One reference work credits Stempel's artistic director Erich Schulz-Anker, working with Arthur Ritzel, while Helvetica Forever attributes the weight and its italic, begun in 1965, to Werner Schimpf, who later succeeded Ritzel at Stempel.

=== Helvetica Inserat (1966) ===
Helvetica Inserat (German for "advertisement") is an extra-condensed version intended mainly for advertising display, narrower than Helvetica Black Condensed. It has an even larger x-height and a more squared appearance, similar to Schmalfette Grotesk. Adobe's release notes date it to 1966 and state that it originated at Stempel.

=== Helvetica Compressed (1966–1968) ===
Helvetica Compressed was designed for phototypesetting by Matthew Carter and Hans-Jürg Hunziker at Mergenthaler Linotype. Carter drew Helvetica Compressed and Extra Compressed, released in 1966, and Hunziker drew Ultra Compressed under his supervision, released in 1968. It shares some features with Helvetica Inserat, but has a curved tail on the 'Q', a downward-pointing branch on the 'r', and a '£' with a tilde-shaped base. Carter has said it was intended to resemble Schmalfette Grotesk and to compete with the British condensed designs Impact and Compacta, which were popular at the time. The family has been digitized, for instance in Adobe's Helvetica release.

=== Other variants ===
Helvetica Rounded, with rounded stroke endings, was released in bold weights; Linotype's release notes date it to 1978.

Helvetica Narrow, a width between Helvetica Compressed and Helvetica Condensed, was created when memory in electronic printers was scarce. Rather than being redrawn, it was produced by mathematically compressing Helvetica to 82 percent of its original width, which narrowed the vertical strokes but left the horizontals unchanged and distorted the letterforms. Because of this distortion, Adobe dropped Helvetica Narrow from its OpenType release of Helvetica and recommended Helvetica Condensed instead.

Helvetica Textbook uses "schoolbook" stylistic alternates to make characters easier to tell apart, including serifed forms of the 'I' and 'J', a 'q' with an upward flick, and '1' and '4' shaped like handwritten figures. Its 'a', 't', 'u', '6' and '9' are replaced with forms resembling those of geometric sans-serifs such as Futura, Akzidenz-Grotesk Schulbuch, and Avant Garde. FontShop's FF Schulbuch is similar.

=== Language variants ===
Helvetica Greek has gone through several versions. Letraset produced a semi-official version for its dry-transfer lettering, available by 1970, which sold well but was considered unidiomatic by Linotype. Linotype published a version designed by Matthew Carter in 1971, which was available for phototypesetting and therefore suitable for general printing, including extended text. In 1974 Carter described the Letraset version as "a poor thing" and Linotype's as "the real one", but felt that the Letraset design was so well established in Greece that it had "caused resistance to our version". Linotype published a new version, designed by John Hudson of Tiro Typeworks, in 2001.

A Cyrillic version was designed in-house at D. Stempel AG in 1972 and was revised in 1992 on the advice of Jovica Veljović. An unofficial adaptation had already been made in 1963 by the Russian designers Maxim Zhukov and Yuri Kurbatov (see below).

==== Helvetica World (2003) ====
Helvetica World, released by Linotype in 2003 as part of its first large OpenType release, is a typeface family of four scalable fonts, in two weights with matching italics, supporting the Arabic, Cyrillic, Greek, Hebrew, and Vietnamese scripts. Its Arabic characters were based on a redesigned version of Linotype's Yakout family, and the Latin characters were respaced and rekerned for consistent spacing. John Hudson of Tiro Typeworks designed its Hebrew, Cyrillic and Greek characters.

== Later versions ==
=== Neue Helvetica (1983) ===
Neue Helvetica weights

Neue Helvetica (German for "New Helvetica"; German pronunciation: [ˈnɔʏə]), known as Helvetica Neue in some digital releases, is a 1983 reworking of the typeface. The redesign brought greater consistency: all weights were given the same cap height, the lowercase was optically matched across the family, and the condensed and extended styles, which had originally come from other typefaces, were brought into line with the rest. A new system of character widths let letters such as the 'M' and the figures be drawn wider, and punctuation was made heavier so that it would reproduce well in phototypesetting. Like Univers, it uses a numbering system to identify its weights and widths, and it was issued in nine weights across four widths: normal, condensed, compressed and extended.

The redesign was carried out at D. Stempel AG, then a Linotype subsidiary. The studio was managed by Wolfgang Schimpf, assisted by Reinhard Haus, and the project was led by René Kerfante; Erik Spiekermann was the design consultant and designed the launch literature.

The designer Christian Schwartz, who later produced his own digitization of the original metal type, criticized Neue Helvetica and other digital releases as "one-size-fits-all": in his view their spacing was too loose for display sizes and too tight for comfortable reading in text.

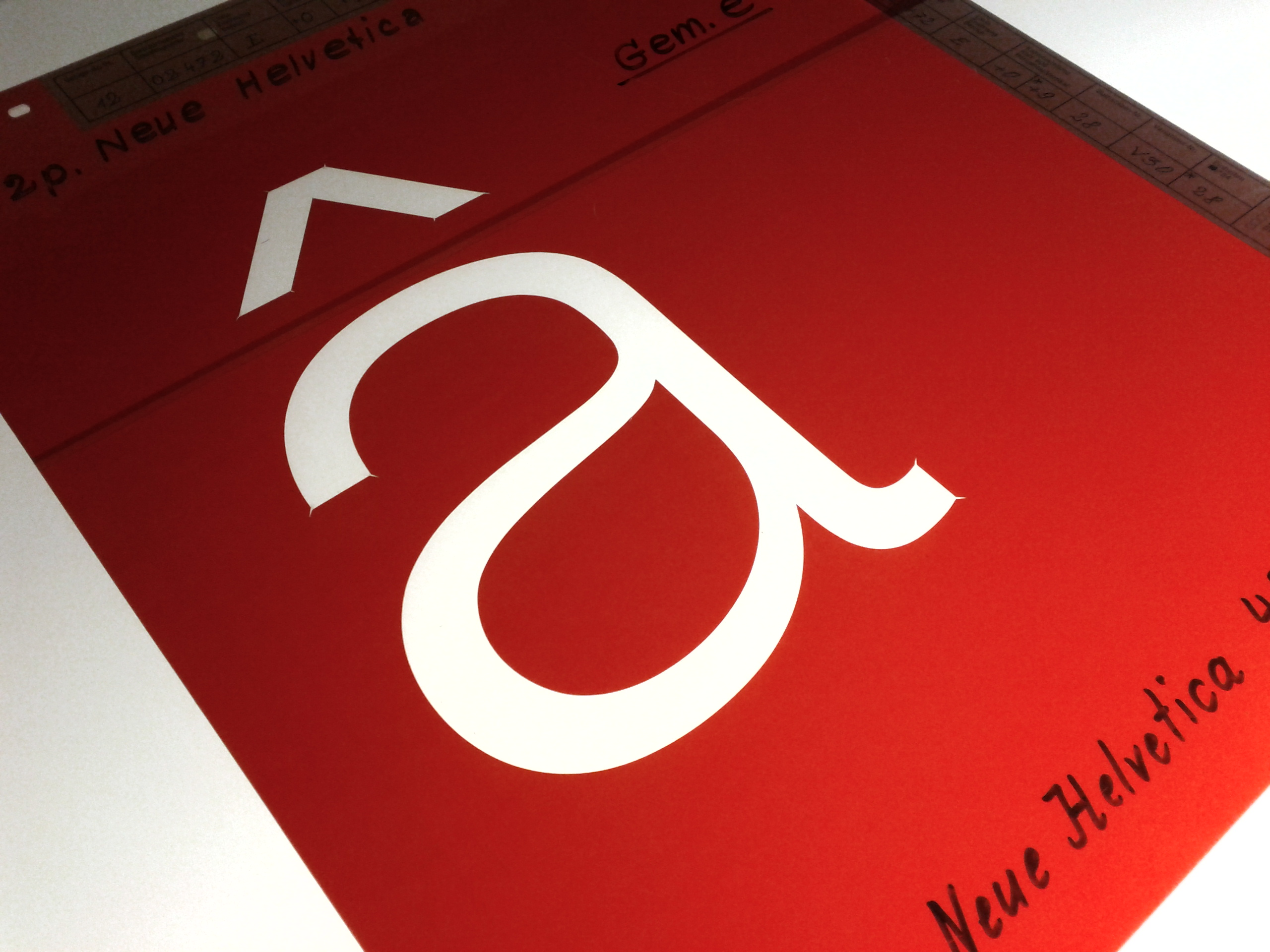
A hand-cut rubylith master used in the 1983 phototypesetting release of Neue Helvetica

Apple switched the iPhone's system font from Helvetica to Neue Helvetica with the iPhone 4 in 2010, and used a specially optimized version as the macOS system font in OS X Yosemite (2014), the only macOS release to do so, before replacing it with San Francisco in 2015 (see Notable uses).

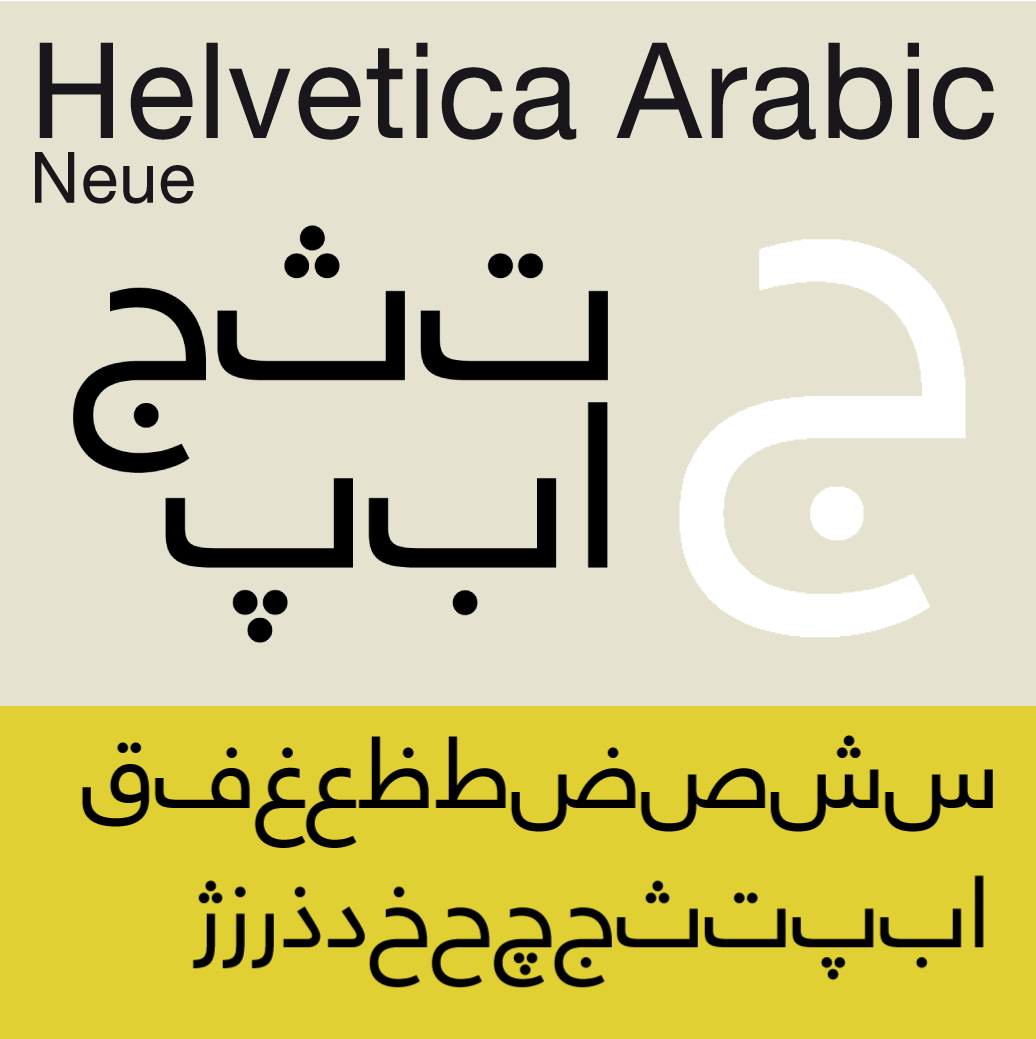
Neue Helvetica Arabic

Neue Helvetica has been extended to other scripts and uses. Neue Helvetica W1G (2009) adds Latin Extended, Greek and Cyrillic characters. Neue Helvetica Arabic (2009) was designed by Nadine Chahine. Neue Helvetica eText (2011), designed by Akira Kobayashi of Monotype, is optimized for screens, with more open spacing and capitals slightly shorter than the lowercase ascenders, a feature common in text typefaces. Anuthin Wongsunkakon of Cadson Demak designed Thai versions of Helvetica and Neue Helvetica (2012) using loopless letterforms, a style he had also used in his earlier typeface Manop Mai. Georgian (2015) and Armenian (2016) versions were designed by Akaki Razmadze and Edik Ghabuzyan respectively. In 2017 Linotype combined these in Neue Helvetica World, which covers the Latin, Cyrillic, Greek, Arabic, Hebrew, Thai, Armenian, Georgian and Vietnamese scripts; it is distinct from the earlier Helvetica World of 2003.

=== Neue Haas Grotesk (2010) ===
Neue Haas Grotesk Text, optically optimized for body text

Neue Haas Grotesk is a digitization by Christian Schwartz based on printed settings of the original metal type, released under the typeface's original name. The project began as part of an abandoned redesign of The Guardian and was released by Linotype (later part of Monotype), Commercial Type and Font Bureau, accompanied by a history of the typeface by Indra Kupferschmid.

Unlike earlier digitizations, it has two optical sizes, Text and Display, with tighter spacing for large sizes and looser spacing for body text. It also includes stylistic alternates not found in releases branded as Helvetica, such as separate punctuation for capitals and lowercase, cedillas styled to match the comma, and shortened figures for running text, (Note: This feature was also included in Robert Slimbach's neo-grotesque Acumin (2014) for Adobe.) as well as a straight-legged 'R' and, in the Display version, a lowercase 'a' without a tail. The release does not include condensed weights or Greek and Cyrillic characters. Reviewing it for Typographica, Matthew Butterick judged it better than any previous digital Helvetica, writing that "it's never looked better". Its users have included Bloomberg Businessweek and the Whitney Museum. Commercial Type has also released monospaced, small-size (agate) and stencil companions.

A variable font version of Neue Haas Grotesk Text, with weights from Ultra Thin to Black, is included with Windows 11 as part of its optional Pan-European Supplemental Fonts; Windows 10 includes the Text version as static fonts. As of 2023, the variable version was not otherwise available.

=== Helvetica Now (2019) ===
Helvetica Now specimen

In April 2019 Monotype released Helvetica Now, an update of Neue Helvetica designed by Jan Hendrik Weber and Charles Nix. It has three optical sizes: Micro, Text and Display. The Display size keeps the horizontal stroke endings of earlier digital versions, while Micro, intended for very small sizes, uses angled endings on letters such as 'e' and 'c', with Text falling between the two. It adds redesigned arrows and '@', circled figures, and alternate characters including a curled lowercase 'l', a spurless 'G', a straight-legged 'R' as in Neue Haas Grotesk, and a single-story 'a' as in Helvetica Textbook. Condensed versions followed in 2021.

In July 2021 Monotype also released Helvetica Now as a variable font in regular and italic styles, with adjustable weight (from hairline to extra black), width (including compressed and condensed) and optical size.

== Clones and derivatives ==
Imitations of Helvetica appeared quickly, especially in the phototypesetting market of the 1960s onward, where typeface designs had little legal protection. Because Linotype held the exclusive right to sell Helvetica for typesetting machines, customers of competing manufacturers such as Compugraphic could not obtain it, and each manufacturer offered its own look-alike instead. Some are close copies intended as direct substitutes, while others only match its character widths, such as Liberation Sans, which is metrically compatible with Helvetica without imitating its design.

=== Clones ===
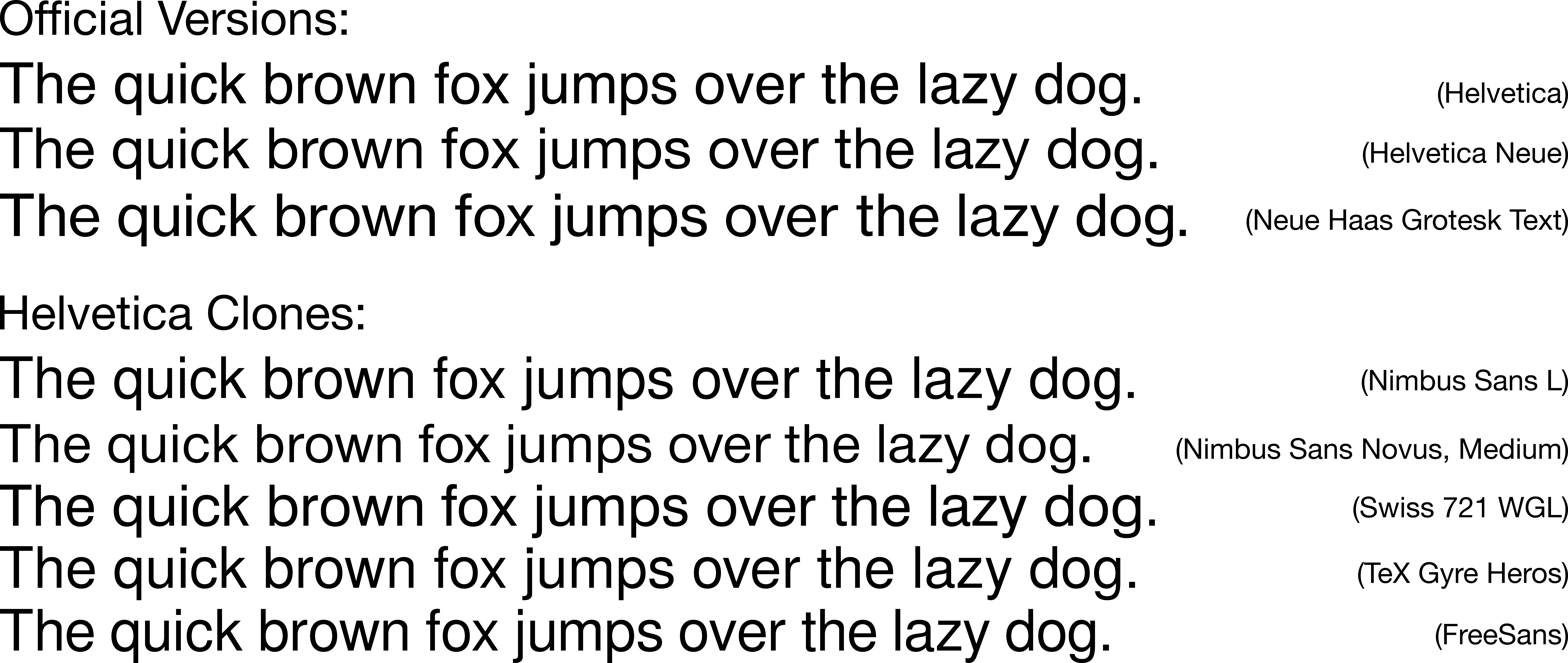
Three official releases of Helvetica compared with five clones at the same font size

One of the best-known clones is Nimbus Sans, developed by URW under Peter Karow. A version called Nimbus Sans L was released under the GNU General Public License as part of the Ghostscript project, a free alternative to PostScript, and became a standard font in many Linux distributions and in open-source software such as R. It in turn became the basis of other free typefaces, including TeX Gyre Heros and FreeSans.

Other clones include Bitstream's Swiss 721, ParaType's Pragmatica, Scangraphic's Europa Grotesk and Compugraphic's CG Triumvirate. Berthold, which could not obtain a license for Helvetica from Linotype, responded with Akzidenz-Grotesk Buch, which is effectively a Helvetica clone. Several clones offered separate display and text versions long before the official family did, and some added support for scripts such as Arabic, Hebrew, Thai and Devanagari. More recent designs in the same vein include Antique Legacy and Haas Recast.

=== Arial and MS Sans Serif ===
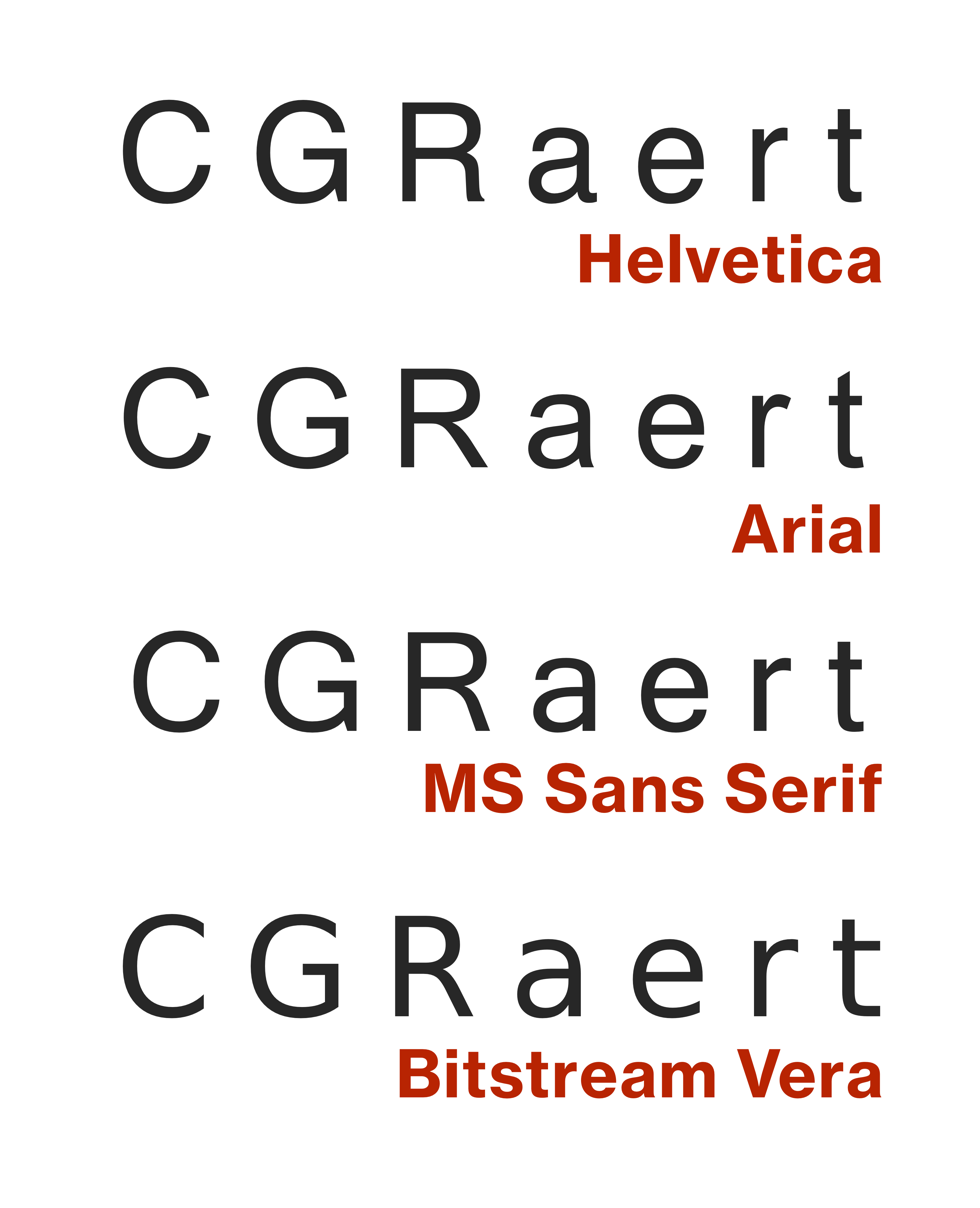
Comparison of Helvetica, Arial and Microsoft Sans Serif, with the unrelated Bitstream Vera for contrast

Arial originated in 1982 as Sonoran Sans, a typeface Monotype developed for IBM. Linotype had licensed Helvetica to IBM's rival Xerox and later to Adobe and Apple, but IBM was unable to secure the rights, so Monotype supplied a design that resembled Helvetica and shared its character widths. Its later inclusion in Microsoft's Windows 3.1 made it one of the most widely used typefaces in office documents. It is often described as a Helvetica clone, including by Matthew Carter, who consulted for IBM while it was being developed. The letterforms differ, however. Type designer Mark Simonson notes that Helvetica's strokes end in horizontal or vertical cuts while Arial, following Monotype Grotesque, uses angled cuts, most visibly in the 't', 'r', 'f' and 'C'; Helvetica's 'G' has a spur that Arial's lacks, its 'R' has a more upright leg, and its '1' and 'Q' are more angular.

Microsoft's "Helv" bitmap font, later renamed MS Sans Serif, shares several of Helvetica's features, including horizontal and vertical stroke endings and fairly even stroke widths.

=== Derivative designs ===
Other typefaces based on Helvetica have clearly different designs or purposes. The type designer Ray Larabie has recalled that in the 1970s "everyone was modifying Helvetica", and three of the twenty winners of a 1973 Letraset typeface competition were decorative designs derived from it. Custom versions have also been made for particular clients, often with special characters such as a straight-legged 'R' or round-topped 'A', and CNN uses a derivative, CNN Sans, with a larger x-height and a '1' with a base.

==== Zhukov and Kurbatov version ====
In 1963 Maxim Zhukov, later a prominent Soviet typographer, and Yuri Kurbatov, both students at the Moscow Printing Institute, adapted Helvetica for Cyrillic. They used upright cursive forms for several lowercase letters so that Helvetica's shapes could be carried over more directly. Their version was widely used in phototypesetting among fellow students but was never issued commercially: an attempt to publish it in 1964 was rejected because the design was seen as too closely associated with capitalism. This contributed to the delay of an official Cyrillic Helvetica, Pragmatica, in the Soviet bloc until 1989. (Note: The lowercase of Zhukov and Kurbatov's design was digitized as Soyuz Grotesk by Roman Gornitsky and released under a free license by The Temporary State. Gornitsky added a Latin alphabet, reconstructed by reversing the original process and adapting the Cyrillic forms to Latin.)

==== Forma (1968) ====
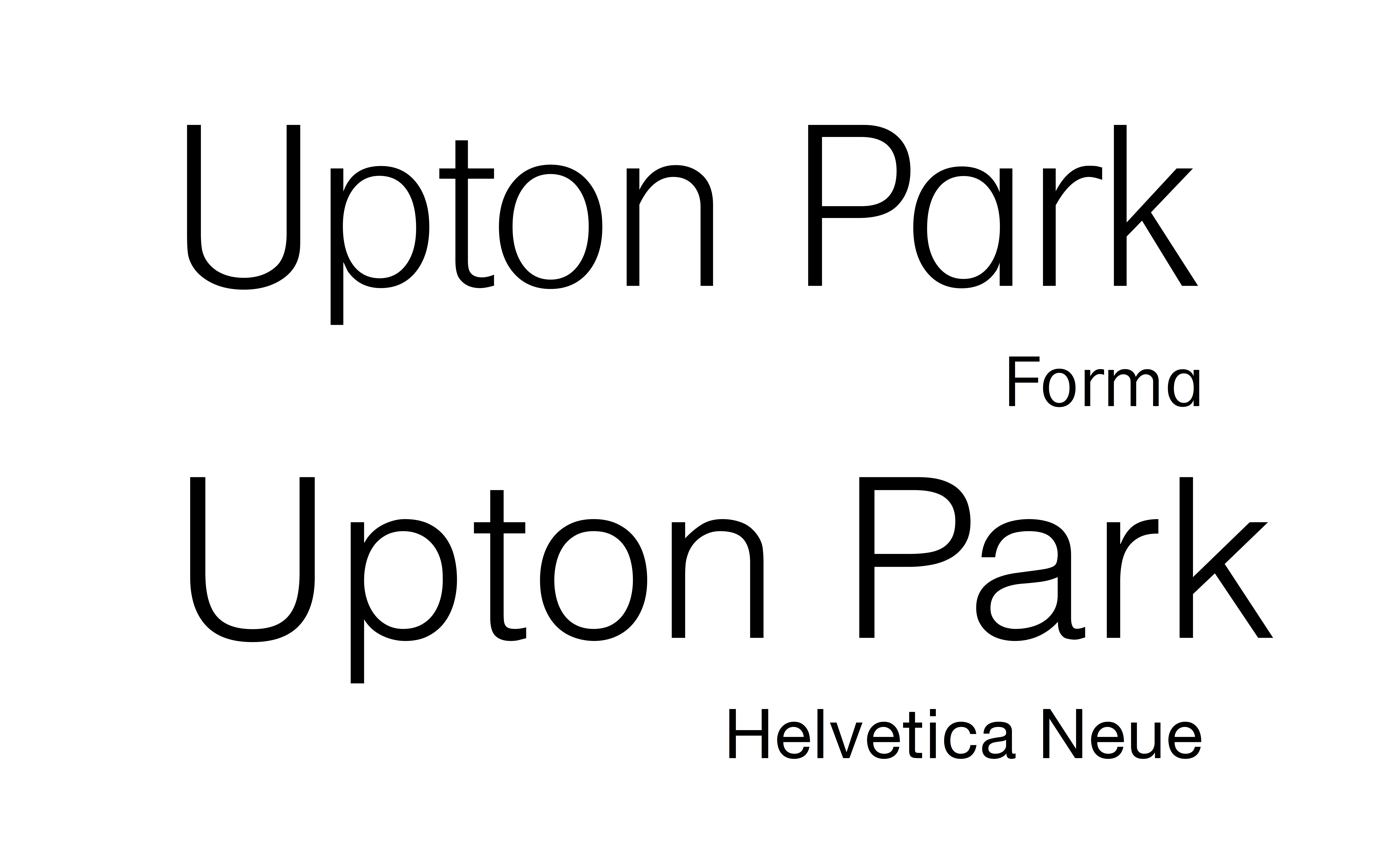
Forma compared with Neue Helvetica

Forma, created by Aldo Novarese at the Italian foundry Nebiolo, is a derivative of Helvetica with geometric influences, a single-story 'a' and very tight spacing in the style of the period. It was offered with alternate characters that imitated Helvetica more closely. It has been digitized by SoftMaker as Formula and, in a more complete version with optical sizes, as Forma DJR by David Jonathan Ross for Tatler magazine.

==== Manoptica (1973) ====
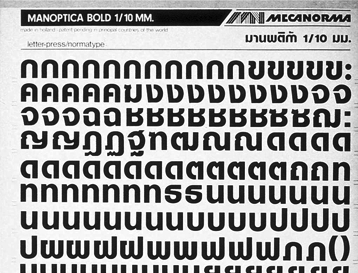
Part of a Manoptica dry-transfer sheet, showing Latin forms such as 'A', 'U', 'R' and 'S' adapted to Thai

Manoptica, designed by Manop Srisomporn, was an early adaptation of Helvetica to the Thai script. It helped popularize loopless Thai letterforms resembling Latin letters, a style that became common in advertising and influenced later simplified Thai typefaces. The adoption of loopless Thai typefaces remains controversial.

==== Helvetica Flair and other Phil Martin designs ====
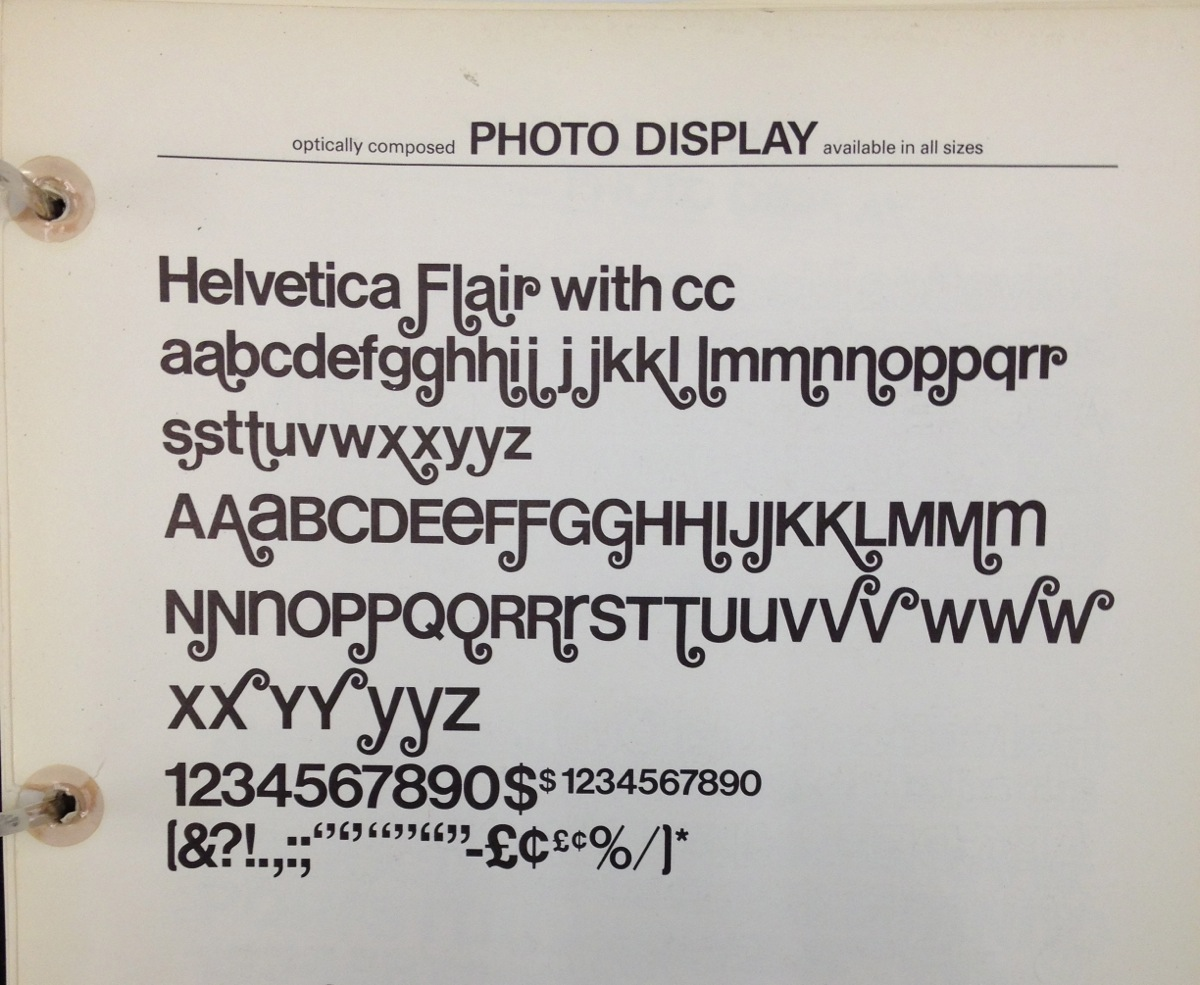
A Helvetica Flair specimen sheet

Helvetica Flair, designed by Phil Martin at Alphabet Innovations in the 1970s, was an unauthorized phototypesetting redesign that added swashes and lowercase-style capitals. Type designer Mark Simonson called the combination of swashes with Helvetica "almost sacrilegious", and Martin recalled being accused of "typographic incest" by one German writer. It has never been released digitally. Martin also drew Heldustry, combining Helvetica with Eurostile, and Helserif, a version with serifs; both have since been digitized.

==== Shatter (1973) ====
Shatter

Shatter, designed by Vic Carless, assembles slices of Helvetica so that the letters appear broken or in motion. It was published by Letraset after jointly winning the company's 1973 typeface competition. Writing in 2014, Tim Spencer described it as a deliberate attack on the authority of Swiss modernist typography, with a "glitch-like mechanical aggression".

==== Unica ====
LL Unica77, a digital revival of Unica

Unica, designed by Team '77 (André Gürtler, Christian Mengelt and Erich Gschwind) for the Haas foundry, combines elements of Helvetica, Univers and Akzidenz-Grotesk (see History). It was developed for phototypesetting and released in 1980, but soon disappeared from the market as phototypesetting gave way to desktop publishing. Two digital versions appeared in the mid-2010s: LL Unica77 from the Swiss foundry Lineto, made with input from Mengelt, and Neue Haas Unica from Linotype.

==== Chalet ====
House Industries' Chalet family is based on Helvetica and on the many adaptations of it in postwar design. Its styles are named after decades: "1960" is conventional, while "1970" and "1980" are more radically altered. House Industries marketed it through the invented story of a Swiss fashion designer, "René Chalet", a play on the company's own name.

==== Coolvetica ====
Coolvetica (top) compared with Helvetica Bold

Ray Larabie released Coolvetica in 1999, drawing on Helvetica Flair, Chalet and similar 1970s adaptations for distinctive letters such as a swash 'G' and a curled 't', and giving it tight default spacing for display use. It became his most downloaded free font.

== Notable uses ==
Helvetica is among the most widely used sans-serif typefaces. It is a common choice for commercial wordmarks; in 2007 the BBC remarked that a list of its users "would fill this page". Corporate identities were among Helvetica's most influential early uses. Otl Aicher's team at the Ulm School of Design used it for Lufthansa in 1962, and in 1967 Massimo Vignelli of Unimark International set the American Airlines logotype in it, an identity that lasted until 2013. The Jeep logo is also based on Helvetica.

Apple made Helvetica the iOS system font in 2007 and later switched to Neue Helvetica, which it also adopted for macOS in 2014. It replaced both with its own San Francisco in 2015.

The designer Virgil Abloh built the visual identity of his fashion label Off-White largely around Helvetica. The brand's products typically carry a single word or short phrase in bold Helvetica capitals, often framed by quotation marks, a device that became closely associated with the label.

Helvetica is also closely associated with the New York City Subway. Unimark's late-1960s signage there initially used Akzidenz-Grotesk, sold in the United States as Standard, because Helvetica was not yet widely available. The Metropolitan Transportation Authority made Helvetica its standard signage typeface in 1989.Shaw, Paul (2011). Helvetica and the New York City Subway System: The True (Maybe) Story. Cambridge, Massachusetts: MIT Press. ISBN 978-0-262-01548-6.

== Reception and cultural impact ==
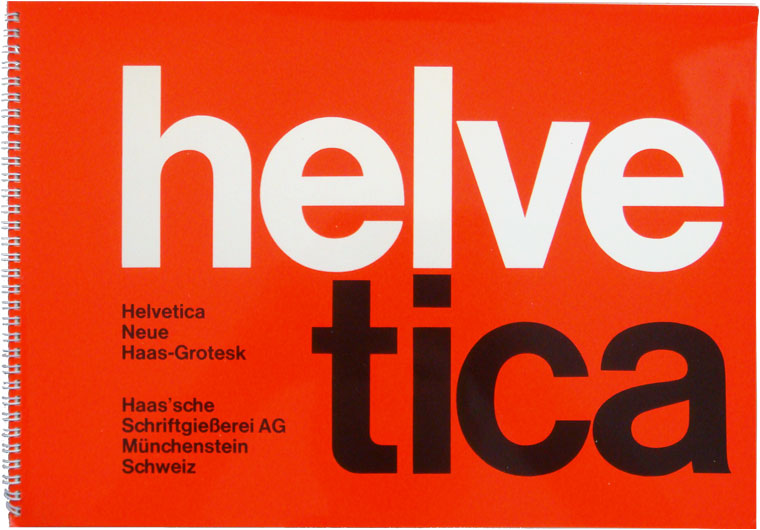
An early Helvetica specimen in the asymmetric Swiss modernist style, showing tight spacing in the poster style of the period

Helvetica's close association with business and government has shaped its reputation. In 1976 Leslie Savan, who wrote about advertising for the Village Voice, published an early essay on the typeface's public image as the lettering of corporations and officialdom; it was later included in her book The Sponsored Life. Some type designers have criticized it, particularly for its ubiquity. Erik Spiekermann and Martin Majoor have both objected to its overuse, and Majoor has called it "rather cheap" for failing to move beyond the model of Akzidenz-Grotesk.

For the typeface's fiftieth anniversary in 2007, director Gary Hustwit released the documentary Helvetica, which premiered at the South by Southwest festival in March. In the film, the Dutch designer Wim Crouwel praised Helvetica's neutrality, arguing that a typeface should carry no meaning of its own and that meaning belongs to the content of the text. Other designers interviewed associated it with authority and corporate power.

The same year, the Museum of Modern Art in New York acquired a set of Helvetica's original lead type, the first typeface to enter its collection, and marked the occasion with the exhibition "50 Years of Helvetica", held from April 6, 2007, to March 24, 2008. Organized by Christian Larsen of the museum's Department of Architecture and Design, it showed more than 25 works, including original metal type from 1956–1957, Massimo Vignelli's 1970 New York City Subway map, album covers and advertising, together with an excerpt from Hustwit's film.
