= Basel Paper Mill =

Museum in Basel (Switzerland)

Coordinates: 47.555°N 7.604°E

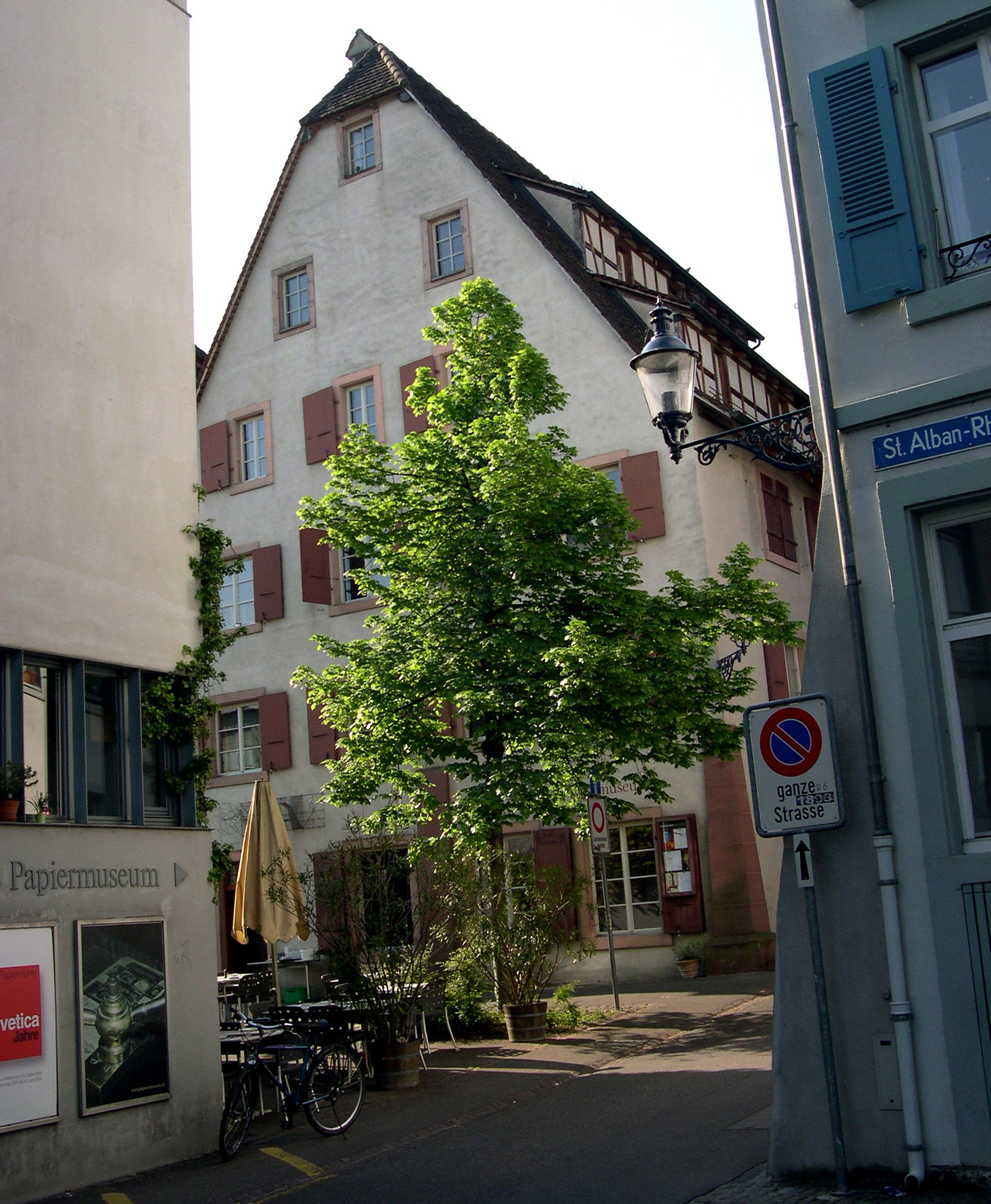
Basel Paper Mill, Basel

The Basel Paper Mill (German: Basler Papiermühle), also known as the Swiss Museum for Paper, Writing and Printing (German: Schweizerisches Museum für Papier, Schrift und Druck), is a museum located in Basel, Switzerland. The museum is primarily dedicated to the history and techniques of papermaking, and the art of book printing and writing in general. Through a combination of pictures and objects, visitors gain insights into the old artisanal techniques of dipping paper, printing and bookbinding.

The museum is located in a carefully restored building that began its life as a paper mill 500 years ago. It is a heritage site of national significance.

== History ==
=== Origins ===
==== 1428-1980 ====
The main building of the Paper Museum was originally a corn mill belonging to Klingental Abbey until 1428.

In 1453, Anton Gallizian converted it into a paper mill. The Gallizian family's involvement in paper production ended in 1521 due to political changes, and the mill was expanded under the Thüring (Düring) family. In 1778, bookseller and publisher Johann Christoph Imhof-Burckhardt acquired the mill and in 1788 replaced a part of it with a two-story structure.

From 1850, the building housed the Hugo brothers' tobacco factory, and later served as a warehouse until it was restored for the museum in 1980.

==== 1980 onward ====
Since 1980, the museum has been housed in a building faithfully restored by the Christoph Merian Foundation on the St. Alban pond, a commercial canal that has existed since the 13th century. On the 19th of September, 1980, the museum was officially inaugurated.

Between 2010 and 2011, the museum underwent extensive renovations and expansion at a cost of CHF 6.6 million. The canton of Basel-Stadt supported the project with 2 million francs, the Christoph Merian Foundation (CMS) added a further 3.5 million.

As part of the renovation the exhibition was reorganised, with clearer displays. The main building, known as the Gallizian Mill, houses the museum's workshops and an event space. The neighbouring Stegreif Mill serves as a café and ticket office, while the Rych Mill to the south includes a shop and additional museum workshops. A 1964 Fourdrinier paper machine is also on display in the Rych Mill. In combination, the museum comes to 1200 square metres.

In 2022, the mill waterwheel underwent renovation with a new 300-year-old oak transmission, measuring 4.3 metres. The age of the oak is needed in order to withstand the stress of the water but it proved difficult to source due to the timber being used within the Notre-Dame Cathedral reconstruction in Paris.

=== Formation of the museum collection ===
Between 1937 and 1963, chemist Walter F. Tschudin, while working in the application department at Sandoz AG in Basel, developed a strong interest in the history of papermaking. In 1958, he published an extensive piece of work on the history of Basel’s paper mills, their operators, watermarks, and ream imprints. During this time, Tschudin also collected significant technical objects, equipment, and historical documents related to papermaking. These items were initially housed in the Swiss Museum of Folklore on Augustinergasse, forming the Swiss Paper History Collection.

On June 22, 1971, the private Basler Papiermühle Foundation was established to support the museum as a sponsor. One of its key founders, entrepreneur Eduard Hoffmann, director of the Haas type foundry, had been dedicated to establishing a museum focused on the printing trade. He died shortly before the museum’s official inauguration.

== Museum description ==
Since 1980, the Basel Paper Mill Museum has been located in a historically restored building by the Christoph Merian Foundation, situated on the St. Alban pond, a commercial canal dating back to the 13th century, repurposed for paper production as early as 1453. The museum's opening exhibition on September 19, 1980, featured handmade paper with a watermark displaying the silhouette of the Gallician Mill and the museum's opening date, along with a reproduction of a two-part Riesdeckblatt imprint from 1594.

The museum provides an in-depth look into traditional papermaking, printing and bookbinding techniques. Approximately 40,000 visitors, including school classes, attend the museum each year. Visitors can experience guided tours, and actively participate by making their own paper in a specially equipped area, printing it on a small press, or experimenting with original calligraphy techniques and marbling in a designated writing room, named the Scriptorium. The workplaces are fully integrated, allowing those with disabilities to also participate.

== Awards ==
In 2017 the Paper Mill Museum received the Schappo award from the Regional President, Elisabeth Ackermann.

== See also ==
- Museums in Basel
- List of museums in Switzerland
