= Cornel Windlin =

Swiss graphic and type designer

Cornel Windlin (born 10 January 1964 in Lucerne) is a Swiss graphic and type designer originally from Kerns (Obwalden) whose work has received national and international awards, been exhibited in museums and published in design books and publications. In addition to his design work, he also lectures regularly in Switzerland and abroad. His work has been extensively recognised in books, trade journals and exhibitions.

He studied graphic design at the Schule für Gestaltung in Lucerne and moved to London in 1987 to work for the graphic designer and typographer Neville Brody. In 1988, after completing his course in Lucerne, he joined Brody's studio on a permanent basis. In 1990, he left to work as a designer and art editor at The Face magazine.

From 1991, he worked as a freelancer and started his own studio, which he moved to Zurich in 1993. He designed a number of award-winning posters for the Rote Fabrik from 1994 to 1996, the Museum für Gestatung Zurich from 1994 to 1999, and other institutions.

Windlin started creating typefaces primarily for use in his own work while still at art school. In 1994, he co-founded the digital type foundry Lineto with Stephan Müller to distribute their fonts and those of close associates. Initially, Lineto was the name of the collaboration between Windlin and Müller, who needed a name under which to publish their typeface Dot Matrix (1993) on FontFont, the typeface library initiated by designers Erik Spiekermann and Neville Brody, before becoming a working digital type foundry. Lineto.com launched online in 1998.

In 1997, he was awarded the Jan Tschichold award, which is bestowed by the Federal Department of Home Affairs (Switzerland) for book design. Along with Gilles Gavillet, he designed the catalogues for the Most Beautiful Swiss Books competition 1998, 1999 and 2000 (awarded respectively in 1999, 2000 and 2001).

From 2007 to 2010, Windlin was the president of the jury for the Most Beautiful Swiss Books. He was awarded the Design Prize Switzerland in 2011.

Since 2004, he is responsible for the concept and visual design of the "Vitra Home" catalogues for Vitra.

He moved to Berlin in 2011, where he co-founded Alphabet, a software engineering company for the production of type, before returning to Zurich to his own studio in 2016.

== Work for the Schauspielhaus Zurich ==
In 2000/2001, he designed posters and the new season brochure for the Schauspielhaus Zurich under the directorship of Christoph Marthaler. During Barbara Frey's directorship from the 2009/10 season until the beginning of the 2010/11 season, Windlin was responsible for the new appearance and overall image of the theatre, which he developed in collaboration with Gregor Huber and Rafael Koch. The theatre's printed matter was developed from a strictly limited set of design tools: a single typeface in a few grades, found media images and a highly reduced colour scheme. The graphic centrepiece was a simple black disc that appeared in different applications in all media. This limited repertoire ensured the design conciseness and content coherence of the visual products. Windlin was awarded the Design Preis Schweiz in the Market category for his work for the Schauspielhaus.

== Awards ==
- 1998: Swiss Design Awards
- 2001, 2002, 2005, 2007: the Most Beautiful Swiss Books
- 2005: Nominated for the Design Prize Switzerland (for "Lineto.com")
- 2007: Bronze medal, Schönste Bücher aus aller Welt (for «Vitra. The Home Collection 2007/2008»)
- 2008: Die schönsten Deutschen Bücher (for «Vitra. The Home Collection 2007/2008»)
- 2011: Design Prize Switzerland (for the visual identity of the Schauspielhaus Zürich)
- 2015: Top 20 Graphic Designers, Wallpaper Magazine

== Typefaces ==
- Alpha Headline
- AutoScape
- Cobra
- Dot Matrix
- Gateway
- Gravur Condensed
- Liquid Crystal
- Luggagetag
- Lutz Headline
- Magda
- Mono
- Moonbase Alpha
- Screen Matrix
- Thermo
- Unica Custom
- Vectrex
- Water Tower

== Selected books ==
- Project vitra: places, products, authors, museum, collections, signs. Birkhäuser Verlag, Basel/Boston 2008, ISBN 978-3-7643-8593-4
- Public affairs: das Öffentliche in der Kunst. Katalog zur Ausstellung "Public Affairs. Von Beuys bis Zittel: Das Öffentliche in der Kunst"; Kunsthaus Zürich, 13. September – 1. Dezember 2002. Kunsthaus, Zürich 2002, ISBN 3-906574-16-4
- Freie Sicht aufs Mittelmeer: junge Schweizer Kunst mit Gästen. Katalog zur Ausstellung 5. Juni – 30. August 1998, Kunsthaus Zürich; 6. Oktober – 22. November 1998 Schirn Kunsthalle Frankfurt. Kunsthaus, Zürich 1998, ISBN 3-906574-02-4
- Endstation Sehnsucht. Katalog zur Ausstellung 2. Juli bis 28. August 1994. Kunsthaus, Zürich 1994
