= Haettenschweiler =

Grotesque sans-serif typeface

- Category: Sans-serif
- Classification: Grotesque
- Designers: Walter Haettenschweiler; Robert Norton (?)
- Foundry: Microsoft
- Date created: 1954

Haettenschweiler is a sans-serif typeface in the grotesque style that is very bold and condensed. It is intended for headlines and display text.

== Schmalfette Grotesk ==
Versions of the font that are now commonly used are descended from an upper-case only design called Schmalfette Grotesk (German for bold condensed sans-serif) by Walter Haettenschweiler that was published in 1954.

Schmalfette was published in the book Lettera (1954) which Haettenschweiler had written with Armin Haab. The Lettera series collected lettering designs (mostly hand-painted) and original designs, and was often used by designers as a source of inspiration.

An early reuse of the design was in the German young peoples' magazine Twen. Microsoft's history of the font, possibly written by Robert Norton (see below) notes that after Lettera 4 was published the design 'was immediately picked up by designers at Paris Match who cut up pictures of it to make headlines' until it was publicly released. Similar methods were also used by British designers, as it was not available in Britain.

== Adaptations and digitisation ==
According to Microsoft's release notes, the Haettenschweiler font in common modern use descends from a later phototypesetting adaptation by the company Photoscript, who created a lower-case for it; its owner Robert Norton would later become Microsoft's font consultant and may also have written Microsoft's unsigned article on its history. The font Haettenschweiler now bundled with much Microsoft software is a digitisation credited to Eraman Ltd. and Monotype Imaging. Haettenschweiler himself did not receive royalties for the design, and commented: "I never received a single cent, but at least they named it after me."

== Aesthetic ==
Haettenschweiler's highly compact, tightly spaced and industrial design is a prominent example of the aggressive, menacing style of graphic design that despite its poor legibility was popular in the 1960s and 70s, and was often used for purposes besides newspapers, such as book covers.

This type of design has been criticised for having low legibility in smaller point sizes, in situations with low contrast between background and text colours, or at a distance, with (for example) 8 and 9 seeming very similar. Counters are minimal and normally fully enclosed, a common feature of 'Grotesk' typefaces, while apertures are very narrow. This folded-up effect gives it a striking appearance at the cost of legibility. The problems are particularly large in a lower-case (which, as previously noted, Haettenschweiler himself declined to design), where the fine detail of the characters mean that strokes run closer together than in the capitals.

== Related typefaces ==
Several fonts were created in the same style in the early-to-mid 1960s, including Helvetica Inserat and British imitators Compacta and Impact. Haettenschweiler has narrower characters than Impact. Geoffrey Lee, who designed Impact in 1963, wrote that "many of us admired the vitality and colour of what we knew only as Schmalfette, and used it by old-fashioned cut and paste. Use was limited as it was never made in metal as far as I know, and existed then in capitals and numerals only." Lee wrote that a motivation for designing Impact was to allow a similar design to be used by British designers, since at the time continental metal type was expensive and complex for British companies to license and use. He also commented that he felt that the lower-case characters added were not so useful: "Later someone added (or found) a lowercase for its new existence. I personally find the style lacks the attractive feel of the caps." Matthew Carter would later design Helvetica Compressed for similar reasons.

A number of alternative digitisations of Schmalfette exist. A custom digitisation is used for the American television show Charlie Rose for branding. Another is "Schmalfette CP", by CounterPoint Type Studio.

== Usage ==
A 2010 Princeton University study involving presenting students with text in a font slightly harder to read found that they consistently retained more information from material displayed in fonts perceived as ugly or disfluent (Monotype Corsiva, Haettenschweiler, and Comic Sans Italic) than in a simpler, more traditional font like Helvetica.

It is used in the Nottingham Forest logo, with a modified R and a lowercase E at upper-case height.

The font is also seen in the Cartoon Network show The Powerpuff Girls, as the text was used for the end credits and promos for the show.

== Bibliography ==
- Haettenschweiler, Walter and Armin Haab. Lettera 4: a standard book of fine lettering. Hastings House, 1972.

== See also ==
- Impact
