= Counter (typography) =

Enclosed area of a letter or symbol

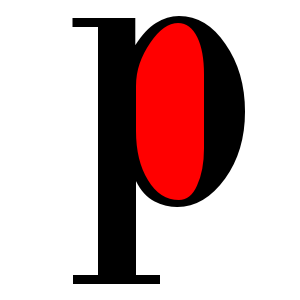
The counter of the letter 'p' shown in red

In typography, a counter is the area of a letter that is entirely or partially enclosed by a letter form or a symbol (the counter-space/the hole of). The stroke that creates such a space is known as a "bowl". Latin letters containing closed counters include A, B, D, O, P, Q, R, a, b, d, e, g, o, p, and q. Latin letters containing open counters include c, f, h, s etc. The digits 0, 4, 6, 8, and 9 also have counters. An aperture is the opening between an open counter and the outside of the letter.

== Open and closed counters ==
Open or closed counters are sometimes a source of typographic variants. The digit '4', for example, has two typographic variants: the closed-top variant '4' has a closed counter, and an open-top (e.g. handwritten) '' has an open counter.

=== Storey ===
Storey refers to the number of open or closed stacked counters, especially in the context of the letters a and g and their typographic variants.

The lowercase 'g' has two typographic variants: the single-storey form (with a hook tail) has one closed counter and one open counter (and hence one aperture); the double-storey form (with a loop tail) has two closed counters. Typically, the letter is given a loop tail in serif typefaces but a hook tail in sans-serif faces (e.g., Times New Roman: g, Helvetica: g). (Note: The typeface displayed here will be substituted with an identical alternative if your operating system does not have those specific fonts installed; i.e. FreeSans/FreeSerif on most Linux distributions, Neue Haas Grotesk on Windows, etc.))

== Open and closed apertures ==
Different typeface styles have different tendencies to use open or more closed apertures. This design decision is particularly important for sans-serif typefaces, which can have very wide strokes making the apertures very narrow indeed.

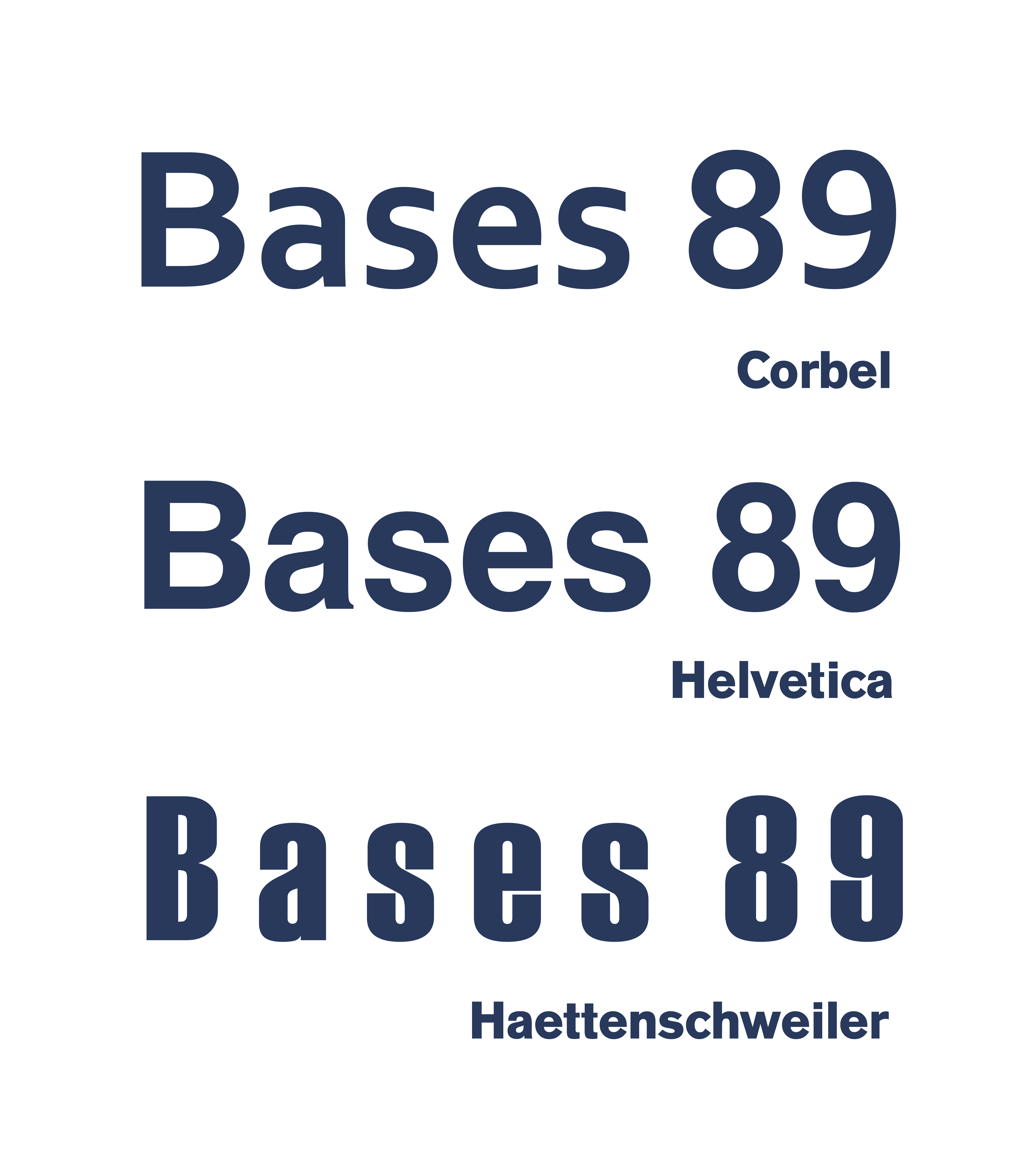
Three sans-serif fonts: Corbel with open apertures, Helvetica with closed apertures and Haettenschweiler which is also condensed. Notice how 8 and 9 in Haettenschweiler are barely distinguishable.

Fonts designed for legibility often have very open apertures, keeping the strokes widely separated from one another to reduce ambiguity. This may be especially important in situations such as signs to be viewed at a distance, materials intended to be viewed by people with vision problems, or small print, especially on poor-quality paper. Fonts with open apertures include Lucida Grande, Trebuchet MS, Corbel and Droid Sans, all designed for use on low-resolution displays, and Frutiger, FF Meta and others designed for print use. This design trend has become increasingly common with the spread of humanist sans-serif designs since the 1980s and the 1990s and the use of computers requiring new fonts which are legible on-screen.

Helvetica can’t do everything...it can be really weak in small sizes. Shapes like ‘C’ and ‘S’ curl back into themselves, leaving tight "apertures"—the channels of white between a letter’s interior and exterior... The lowercase ‘e,' the most common letter in English and many other languages, takes an especially unobliging form. These and other letters can be a pixel away from being some other letter.

— Tobias Frere-Jones

Grotesque or neo-grotesque sans-serif fonts like Helvetica use very closed apertures, folding up stroke ends to make them closer together. This gives these designs a distinctive, compact appearance, but may make similar letterforms hard to distinguish. Closed letterforms on highly condensed grotesque designs such as Impact and Haettenschweiler make characters such as 8 and 9 almost indistinguishable at small print sizes. Designer Nick Shinn has suggested that the cause of this design trend, similar to the Didone serif typefaces of the nineteenth century, may have been the desire to distribute the pressure of the printing press on the type, reducing wear.

== See also ==
- Figure space
- Thin space
- Paren space
- Counterpunch (typography)
