= Impact (typeface) =

Grotesque sans-serif typeface

- Category: Sans-serif
- Classification: Grotesque
- Designer: Geoffrey Lee
- Foundry: Stephenson Blake
- Date created: 1965
- Design based on: Anzeigen Grotesk/Neue Aurora IX
- Variations: Impact Wide

Impact is a sans-serif typeface in the industrial or grotesque style designed by Geoffrey Lee in 1965 and released by the Stephenson Blake foundry of Sheffield. It is well known for having been included in the core fonts for the Web package and distributed with Microsoft Windows since Windows 98. In the 2010s, it gained popularity for its use in image macros and other internet memes.

== Design ==
Lee was an advertising design director and designed Impact as a display typeface with posters and publicity material in mind. Its thick strokes, compressed letterspacing, and minimal interior counterform are specifically aimed, as its name suggests, to "have an impact". Impact has a high x-height, reaching nearly to three-quarters the capital line. Ascenders are short, and descenders even shorter. With narrow apertures and folded-up letterforms, the lower-case can be quite hard to read printed small, especially for people with vision problems. The face is intended for headlines and display use rather than body text. As a display design, it was not released with an italic or bold weight.

During the 1960s, there was a trend towards condensed, bold, "industrial" sans-serifs like Schmalfette Grotesk and Compacta, largely pioneered by West German magazine Twen, and Impact was intended to fit this trend.

Writing in 2004, the year before his death, Lee explained that the design goal was "to get as much ink on paper as possible in a given size with the maximum possible x-height" and to provide a home-grown metal type alternative to European designs in the style (e.g. Schmalfette Grotesk, illustrated in Lettera, a contemporary anthology series of lettering), which were complicated for British businesses to license and use. Lee wrote that "many of us admired the vitality and colour of what we knew only as Schmalfette, and used it by old-fashioned cut and paste. Use was limited as it was never made in metal as far as I know, and existed then in capitals and numerals only". (Schmalfette Grotesk was later digitised, with an added lower-case, as Haettenschweiler by Eraman Ltd.) Other designs along the same lines from around the same period included the Letraset face Compacta, Matthew Carter's slightly earlier masthead of Private Eye (which is caps-only but based on a never-released typeface with a lower case), and the phototypesetting Helvetica Compressed, also by Carter and released a few years later.

== Release ==
Impact was initially promoted with a brochure titled 'The Impact of Impact'. Shown is the front page of Geoffrey Lee's own copy.

Released at the end of the age of metal type as phototypesetting gained popularity, it was one of Stephenson Blake's last typefaces released in metal.

The design rights were acquired by Monotype, which ultimately licensed the design to Microsoft as part of a package of fonts for use with Windows in the 1980s and 1990s.

The original design contained wider alternate forms for the letters 'J' and 'r', intended for letter positions at the start and end of words, which have generally not been included in digitisations. The common digitisation also removed bevelling of the dots on 'i' and 'j' and flared stroke ends on the original metal type release. An eccentricity preserved in the digitisation is the ampersand, which is only as high as the x-height, not the cap height.

Lee digitised and self-released a variant, Impact Wide, in 2002 for online sale. This release includes the alternate characters and an italic style.

In July 2010, Ascender Corp introduced Impact 2010, an enhanced version with additional OpenType typographic features designed by Terrance Weinzierl and Steve Matteson. These included unusual interlocking characters, text figures and proportional and tabular figures.

== Usage ==
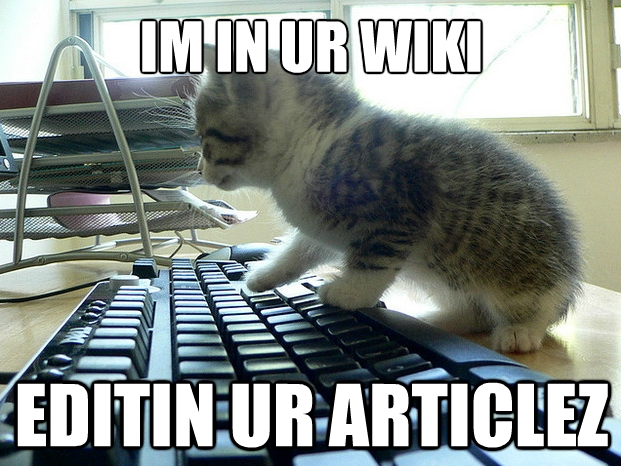
Example of a Lolcat meme using Impact font

It is frequently used in image macros with a white colour and black stroke. This is due to its intense consistency, readability, and accessibility regardless of the background image. It is considered to be a staple of the image genre and is likely the most iconic use of the font. With the pervasive use of Impact in memes, it is now often used ironically.

Activision's video game franchise Call of Duty previously used Impact typeface for its logo until 2023.

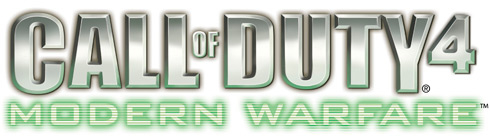
Impact being used in the logo for Call of Duty 4: Modern Warfare.

== See also ==
- Compacta
- Haettenschweiler
