= Max Miedinger =

Swiss type designer (1910–1980)

- Miedinger working on Helvetica
- Born: 24 December 1910; Zurich, Switzerland
- Died: 8 March 1980 (aged 69); Zurich, Switzerland
- Education: Kunstgewerbeschule Zürich
- Occupation: Typographer
- Notable work: Helvetica

Max Miedinger (24 December 1910 – 8 March 1980) was a Swiss typeface designer, best known for creating the Neue Haas Grotesk typeface in 1957, renamed Helvetica in 1960. Marketed as a symbol of cutting-edge Swiss technology, Helvetica achieved immediate global success.

Between 1926 and 1930 Miedinger trained as a typesetter in Zurich, after which he attended evening classes at the Kunstgewerbeschule Zürich.

By the time Miedinger died in 1980, his Helvetica idea, for which the company Linotype paid him royalties until the time of his death, had become a huge part of the typographical landscape.

== Early career ==
From the age of 16, from 1926 to 1930, Miedinger apprenticed as a typographic composer with the printer Jacques Bollmann in Zurich. After completing his apprenticeship, he worked from 1930 to 1936 for various companies, while attending evening classes at the Kunstgewerbeschule in Zurich.

At 26 he went to work as a typographer in the advertising department of Globus, a renowned chain of department stores. After ten years at Globus, Miedinger gained employment with Haas Type Foundry as a representative. In 1954, he created his first typeface design for Haas, Pro Arte, a condensed slab serif.

Miedinger also worked under Eduard Hoffmann, Swiss Entrepreneur, to create a new face or identity for Haas. Surprisingly the company Stempel, the main company of Haas, changed the name to Helvetica when they decided to market it to other businesses outside such as Germany. Both Miedinger and Hoffmann were bothered by the similarity of the names since it would translate to the Latin word Switzerland, Helvetia.

== Career ==
Helvetica, typeface designed by Max Miedinger

Miedinger returned to Zurich as a freelance graphic designer when Eduard Hoffmann, director of the Haas foundry, commissioned him in 1956 to design a new Grotesk typeface. It was officially presented, under the name Neue Haas Grotesk, on the occasion of Graphic 57, a major exhibition of the graphic industry that takes place at the Palais de Beaulieu, in Lausanne. Only the semi-bold series (size 20) was then presented.

In 1960, supplemented by the lean, bold and italic series, the font was marketed under the name Helvetica. Publication of Neue Helvetica, based on old Helvetica, by Linotype in 1983. All rights ceded to Linotype in 1989.

== Designs ==
- Helvetica (also known as Neue Haas Grotesk and Swiss 721 BT)
- Pro Arte, a condensed slab serif in a French Clarendon style. Digitised as Münchenstein Slab.
- Horizontal, a wide capitals design similar to Microgramma. Digitised as Miedinger.
- Helvetica Monospace
- Helvetica Inserat
