= Scantext =

Scantext was a professional code-driven digital typesetting system popular in the 1980s, rendered obsolete by the popularity of the personal computer and desktop publishing software. It was developed and built by Scangraphic, a division of Dr. Böger Duplomat Apparate GmbH & Co. KG, based in Wedel near Hamburg, Germany.

== System ==
The Scantext 1000 system comprised a CPU with multiple 8" disk drives, keyboard and monitor, the latter displaying coordinates and codes defining a page layout. The left-hand drive was intended for recording document data; the second for required font data. In the early years, no preview was available, the operator seeing only typesetting codes ("working blind"). Later, a non-interactive (green) monochrome preview display was introduced.

The Scantext 1000 system was developed under the operating system CP/M and used Zilog Z80 processors.

The 1000 system also featured an optional font editing package, allowing not only modification of existing fonts but the creation of entirely new designs. This software displayed individual font characters for pixel-based editing, in conjunction with an attached stylus. An optional drum scanner facilitated the input of new designs to create new fonts or pi characters.

To compensate for the lack of differently-sized master character images (as implemented in Monotype's Monophoto system, for instance), proportional scaling was implemented: the larger the type size specified, the tighter the spacing (an automatic feature). (For pi fonts and connecting scripts this was over-ridden by implementing a font number beginning with the figure 5, cancelling auto letterspacing.)

The Scantext 1000 system was completed by a filmsetter unit using CRT technology.

For the Scantext 2000 system a new hardware platform was defined. It made use of the Motorola 68000 processor series and 3.5" disk drives. The operating system was a Unix-derivate called OS-9. The workstation Scantext 2000 Commander featured a monochrome page preview display, plus additions to the page description language which allowed the creation of graphic primitives. The 2000 Commander also implemented the incorporation and display of bitmap images in conjunction with the optional flatbed scanner.

The system was completed by the filmsetter unit, a drum-based laser imagesetter with a (then massive) 10Mb hard drive.

== Autotabs ==
The Scantext system had some features which present-day typesetting software would do well to emulate: autotabs in particular were a feature ahead of their time. Scangraphic featured both horizontal and vertical tabs which could be defined as a percentage of page size, it therefore being possible to create layouts which reconfigured themselves to new page sizes.

== Vertical autotabs ==
The Scantext system allowed a vertical autotab to be created at any point: at any ad hoc point in a column a command could be issued to close the current vertical tab; it was then possible, for instance, to type a command to box-in or to scribe vertical rules to fill the current working tab, even though its dimensions were unknown.

== Fonts ==
Scantext Bodytypes were scanned with a video camera at a typical resolution of 512 lines. It is worth noting that, although font editing was pixel-based, character outlines were vectorized in software, thus allowing continuous scaling of any character up to 72 point / 18 mm cap height. For headline setting, Scangraphic introduced a separate range of headline fonts (marketed as Supertypes) with very tight spacing (as was the style at the time). The digital outlines of these fonts were originated by the digital type foundry URW in Ikarus Format and tailored by the Scangraphic type studio. The Supertype font format itself used short vectors (multiple edit points, a legacy of Ikarus encoding, as opposed to the more minimal PostScript vectorization technique). These fonts could be scaled up to a capital height of 90 mm. By 1991, Scangraphic had released its Supertype font library in Adobe’s PostScript Type1 font format for the Apple Macintosh. This range of designs is still available today.

== Barcodes ==
The Scantext system possessed the then-unique capability to generate EAN/UPC-compliant barcodes in position on the imaged page. This was accomplished by the use of a proprietary EAN/UPC (5-numbered non-proportional) font which assigned elements of the upper and lower halves of the barcode to specific positions on the Scantext keyboard. The barcode was thus constructed in two parts (upper and lower), the operator being entirely responsible for ensuring that the correct bars were used in the correct position. This required knowledge of the three bar sets used in EAN/UPC encoding, the correct encoding sequence for each country and the computation of the required check digit.
