= Maurice Goldberg =

American photographer and painter

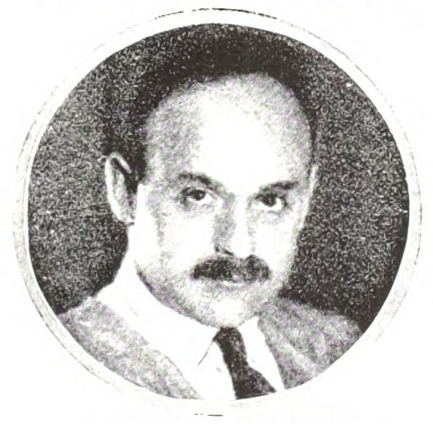
Maurice Goldberg

Maurice Goldberg (1881–1949) was an American painter and photographer. He was born in the Russian Empire and emigrated to the United States where became a noted portrait photographer. A collection of his work is in the Margaret Herrick Library of the Institute of art and photography.
