= Lineto =

Swiss font foundry

Lineto is a Swiss type foundry founded by Cornel Windlin and Stephan Müller in 1993. In 1998, Lineto launched a website to distribute their fonts digitally. In 2007, Jürg Lehni joined the venture.

The most well known fonts on Lineto's catalogue include:

- Alpha Headline, designed by Cornel Windlin in 1991, derived from the standard UK car registration plates. Mitsubishi Motors Europe acquired exclusive license for the Alpha Headline fonts for the duration of ten years, expiring December 2012.
- Simple, designed by Norm (graphic design group) in 2001 and adapted at the request of Ruedi Baur of Intégral Ruedi Baur Paris to be used as the signage typeface of Cologne Bonn Airport
- Akkurat, designed by Laurenz Brunner in 2004 (awarded a Swiss Federal Design Award in 2006) and which proved widely popular
- LL Circular, designed by Laurenz Brunner in 2005–2013, used widely in publications, advertisement and branding, for example by Airbnb (for general branding application) and on the Transport for West Midlands network in the United Kingdom.
- LL Brown, designed by Aurèle Sack in 2007–2011, used widely in publications, advertisement and branding, including as above by companies such as Airbnb (for its logo)
- Replica, designed by Norm in 2008, used notably for the 2012 rebrand of VH1
- Unica (typeface), digitised by Christian Mengelt, from the original Team'77, in 2012–2014, based on their 1974-1980 drawings
- LL Prismaset, a digitisation and elaboration of Rudolf Koch's Prisma (1928–31), designed by James Goggin, Rafael Koch and Mauro Paolozzi (2003–2014).
Typefaces published by Lineto

Akkurat, Laurenz Brunner, 2004

Unica77 LL, Team'77
