= Scangraphic =

- Formerly: Mannesmann Scangraphic (1989-1994); Scangraphic PrePress Technology GmbH (from 1994)
- Type: Division
- Founders: Bernd Holthusen; Knut Schmiedl
- Headquarters: Wedel, Germany
- Parent: Mannesmann AG (1989-1994); ITRACO Holding (from 1994); Dr. Böger Duplomat Apparate GmbH & Co.KG
- Website: scangraphic.de

Scangraphic is a division of Dr. Böger Duplomat Apparate GmbH & Co.KG, based in Wedel near Hamburg, Germany. It was founded by Bernd Holthusen and Knut Schmiedl.

Mannesmann AG acquired Scangraphic in 1989, and the company was renamed Mannesmann Scangraphic. By 1994 Mannesmann Scangraphic is sold to the ITRACO Holding. The company is now called Scangraphic PrePress Technology GmbH. The company designed, developed and produced digital typesetting systems: Scantext 1000, launched in 1981 and Scantext 2000, launched in 1986.
