= Haas Type Foundry =

Swiss type foundry

Haas Type Foundry Haas'sche Schriftgiesserei
- Industry: Type foundry
- Founded: 1740
- Founder: Jean Exertier
- Defunct: 1989
- Headquarters: Basel, Switzerland
- Key people: Johann Wilhelm Haas

Haas Type Foundry buildings in Münchenstein, Switzerland

Haas Type Foundry (Haas'sche Schriftgiesserei) was a Swiss manufacturer of foundry type. First the factory was located in Basel, in the 1920s they relocated to Münchenstein.

== History ==
Haas traces its origins back to the printer Jean Exertier who began casting type during the second half of the 16th century, later passing to the Genath family. In 1718, Johann Wilhelm Haas (1698–1764) from Nuremberg was hired. He later inherited the company as recognition of his efforts. After 1740, the business was run under the Haas name. In 1927 the Stempel Foundry acquired a shareholding in the Haas foundry and the two foundries begin to share matrices. Haas purchased the French foundries Deberny & Peignot in 1972, and Fonderie Olive in 1978. With Linotype’s acquisition of the D. Stempel AG in 1985, they became the majority shareholder. In 1989, Linotype shut down the Haas Foundry, retaining the rights to the typefaces, and transferring metal typefounding operations to Walter Fruttiger AG.

== Typefaces ==
These foundry types were produced by Haas:

- Akzidenz-Grotesk (also Accidenz-Grotesk; not to be confused with Berthold’s Akzidenz Grotesk)
  - Akzidenz-Grotesk mager, Wagner & Schmidt
  - Akzidenz-Grotesk halbfett, Wagner & Schmidt
  - Akzidenz-Grotesk fett, Wagner & Schmidt
  - Akzidenz-Grotesk breitmager, Wagner & Schmidt
  - Akzidenz-Grotesk breithalbfett, Wagner & Schmidt
  - Akzidenz-Grotesk breitfett, Wagner & Schmidt
- Aldine
- Alt-Fraktur fett, 1840
- Altgotisch fett
- Anzeigen Grotesk fett
- Basler Fraktur
  - Basler Fraktur halbfett
  - Basler Fraktur fett
  - Basler Fraktur schmalhalbfett
- Basler Schwabacher
- Bodoni
  - Bodoni Antiqua mager, 1927, E. Thiele, Berthold Types
  - Bodoni Kursiv mager, 1928, E. Thiele, Berthold Types
  - Bodoni Antiqua normal, 1924, E. Thiele, Berthold Types
  - Bodoni Kursiv normal, 1924, E. Thiele, Berthold Types
  - Bodoni Antiqua halbfett, 1926, E. Thiele, Berthold Types
  - Bodoni Kursiv halbfett, 1926, E. Thiele, Berthold Types
  - Bodoni Antiqua fett, 1930, E. Thiele, Berthold Types
  - Bodoni Kursiv fett, 1931, E. Thiele, Berthold Types
  - Bodoni Antiqua schmalfett, 1938, E. Thiele, Berthold Types
- Boutique, a nineteenth-century face.
- Bravo, 1945, Emil A. Neukomm
- Carmen, 1940, Berthold Types
- Caslon
  - Caslon Antiqua, 1940, Berthold Types
  - Caslon Kursiv, 1924
- Castor, Albert Auspurg
- Chancelère moderne
- Chevalier (1946, E. A. Neukomm, Linotype)
- Clarendon
  - Clarendon kräftig (1951-53, Hermann Eidenbenz, Linotype)
  - Clarendon fett (1953, Hermann Eidenbenz, Linotype)
- Cleo
  - Cleo halbfett
- Columbia
- Commercial Grotesk
  - Commercial Grotesk halbfett, 1940, E. Thiele
  - Commercial Grotesk fett, 1945
  - Commercial Grotesk Compact, 1964
- Cosmos, 1989
- Diethelm Roman (1948-50, Walter Diethelm), later Linotype (Frankfurt) (1957)
- Écriture ornée
- Egyptienne
  - Egyptienne halbfett
- Estienne
- Etienne schmalfett (1902) originally cast by Wagner & Schmidt, later cast by Stempel and Amsterdam.
- Favorita
  - Favorita fett
- Fontana
- Froben Gotisch, Wagner & Schmidt
  - Froben Gotisch halbfett, Wagner & Schmidt
- Gotisch modern, Hermann Eidenbenz
- Graphique, 1945
- Graziella
- Französische Grotesk, Schelter & Giesecke
  - Grotesk halbfett
  - Grotesk schlank fett
  - Grotesk kompakt, 1893
  - Grotesk breitfett
  - Grotesk eng
- Helvetica aka. Neue Haas Grotesk, 1957, Max Miedinger, Linotype
  - Helvetica mager, 1958, Max Miedinger, Linotype
  - Helvetica halbfett, 1957, Max Miedinger, Linotype
  - Helvetica Kursiv halbfett, 1969, Linotype
  - Helvetica fett, 1959, Max Miedinger, Linotype
  - Helvetica Kursiv fett, 1967, Linotype
  - Helvetica extrabreit leicht, 1972
  - Helvetica extrabreit viertelfett, 1974
  - Helvetica breitfett, 1959
  - Helvetica schmalhalbfett
  - Helvetica schmalfett
  - Helvetica Compact, 1964
  - Helvetica Outline, 1973
- Herkules
- Hermes, 1922
- Horizontal, 1965, Max Miedinger
- Ideal Antiqua schmalhalbfett, E. Thiele
- Ideal Roman (1941), a nineteenth-century design, later cast by Stempel as Jeannette
- Inserat Grotesk
  - Inserat Grotesk schmal, Wagner & Schmidt
  - Inserat Grotesk fett, Wagner & Schmidt
- Juno
  - Juno mager, Wagner & Schmidt
  - Juno fett, Wagner & Schmidt, Linotype
- »Libertas«, Zweifarbenschrift
- Normal-Grotesk§ (derivative of Haas Akzidenz-Grotesk)
  - Normal Grotesk mager
  - Normal Grotesk Kursiv mager
  - Normal Grotesk halbfett
  - Normal Grotesk fett
  - Normal Grotesk dreiviertelfett
  - Normal Grotesk breitmager
  - Normal Grotesk breithalbfett
  - Normal Grotesk breitfett, Wagner & Schmidt
- Normande
  - Normande englisch
  - Normande neu
- Nürnberger Schwabacher, 1927
- Pollux, 1925, Albert Auspurg
- Pro Arte, 1954, Max Miedinger
- Profil, 1947, Eugen and Max Lenz, Bitstream
- Renaissance
  - Renaissance modern mager
  - Renaissance Kursiv
  - Renaissance halbfett
  - Renaissance Kursiv halbfett
- Rhenania, Wagner & Schmidt
- Rhenania
  - Rhenania Kursiv, Wagner & Schmidt
  - Rhenania halbfett, Wagner & Schmidt
  - Rhenania fett, 1941, Wagner & Schmidt
  - Rhenania schmalhalbfett, Wagner & Schmidt
- Riccardo, Richard Gerbig
- Romana
  - Romana Kursiv
  - Romana halbfett
  - Romana Kursiv halbfett
  - Romana fett
- Sculptura, 1957
- Stella
- Superba
  - Superba, 1934, E. Thiele
  - Superba fett, 1937, E. Thiele
  - Superba licht, E. Thiele
- Teutonisch, 1934
- Titania, about 1906
- Troubadour, 1926, Wagner & Schmidt
  - Troubadour halbfett, 1928, Wagner & Schmidt
  - Troubadour licht, 1931, E. Thiele
- Unica, 1980, Team ’77
- Universa, 1924
- Vertical, 1955
