= Grotesk =

Grotesk may refer to:

- Akzidenz Grotesk, a typeface
- Grotesk (comics), a Marvel Comics character
- Grotesque (typeface classification), a typeface classification
- Grotesk, a DC Comics story-arc by John Ostrander and Tom Mandrake appeared in Batman (vol. 1) #659-662

- Grotesk, a character introduced in this story-arc

== See also ==
- Grotesque
