= Walbaum (typeface) =

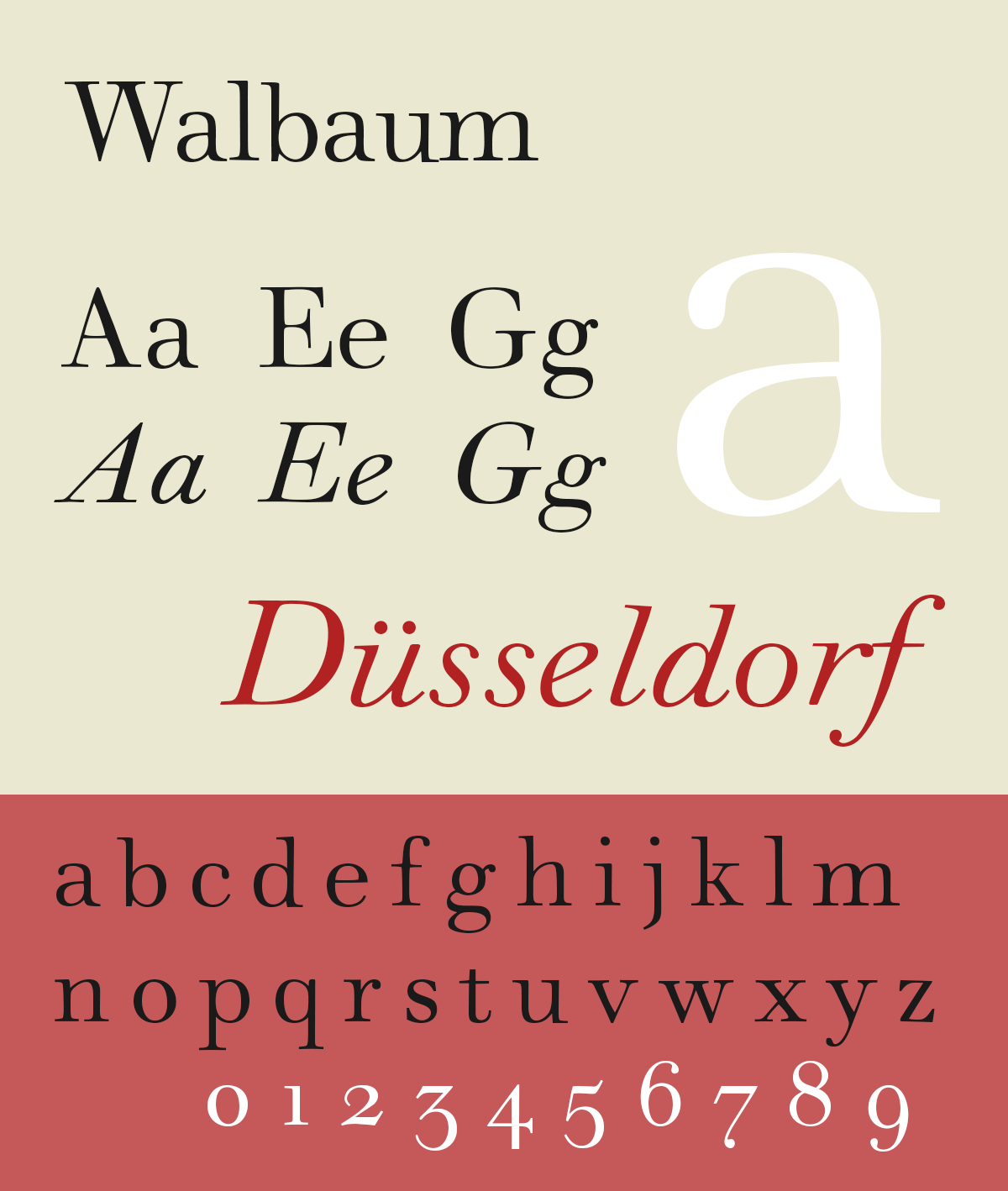
- Category: Serif
- Classification: Didone
- Designer: Justus Erich Walbaum
- Foundry: Monotype
- Date created: 1800
- Re-issuing foundries: H. Berthold AG

Walbaum is the name given to serif typefaces in the "Didone" or modern style that are, or revive the work of early nineteenth-century punchcutter Justus Erich Walbaum (1768–1837), based in Goslar and then in Weimar.

Walbaum-style typefaces are "rational" in design, with minimal serifs and strong contrast between thin horizontal and thick vertical strokes, following the work of typefounders such as Firmin Didot and Giambattista Bodoni. They are often used in publishing and remain very popular in Germany. Walbaum also designed fraktur blackletter typefaces, which (while not stylistically related) similarly have a structured and precise design. Walbaum sold the materials of his foundry to Brockhaus, who in turn sold them to the Berthold Type Foundry.

In the twentieth century, Walbaum's type regained popularity through its sale by Berthold and copies were made by several companies. Digital revivals exist from František Štorm (in a release with optical sizes), Monotype (a 1933 version created for its hot metal typesetting system, and a separate digital version released in 2018), Berthold, Linotype and others.
