= Günter Gerhard Lange =

A sample of fonts designed by Lange

Günter Gerhard Lange (12 April 1921, in Frankfurt (Oder) – 2 December 2008, in Großhesselohe near Munich) was a German typographer, teacher and type designer.

He was longtime art director of Berthold Type Foundry and was one of the fathers of font design after 1945.

Günter Gerhard Lange studied calligraphy and type design, typesetting and printing with Georg Belwe at the Staatlichen Akademie für graphische Künste und Buchgewerbe Leipzig, as well as drawing, painting, etching and lithography with Hans Theo Richter. After graduating with distinction he worked in Leipzig from 1945 to 1949 as freelance painter and graphic designer, as well as being assistant to Walter Tiemann. In October 1949 Günter Gerhard Lange moved to West Berlin and continued his academic studies with Prof. Paul Strecker at the Hochschule für bildende Künste (Academy for Fine Arts) in Berlin.

1950 GGL started working for H. Berthold AG a career that was to span four decades: first as freelancer, when he designed lead casting fonts for hand typesetting, among them Derby, Solemnis, Boulevard, Regina, Champion and Arena. As early as 1952 the H. Berthold AG started the gradual transition from lead type to photo typesetting. Günter Gerhard Lange championed the transfer of the type heritage of the lead type era to the new technologies of photosetting, later to digital techniques. In 1960 he became Art Director of Berthold AG, from 1961 in a salaried position.

During this period he created nearly 100 original fonts with reference character, e.g. the Concorde, the Akzidenz-Grotesk Buch and the Imago, as well as a series of photoset compatible and later digitalised adaptations and new interpretations of historic font styles, e.g. the Garamond, the Walbaum-Antiqua, the Caslon and the Bodoni Old Face.

Besides his work with H. Berthold AG he taught, among others, in Berlin, Kassel, Munich and Vienna and gave numerous lectures at home and abroad. His style of delivery, often rather provocative, and his drastic rhetoric earned him the nickname of "Gutenberg’s Machine gun".

Günter Gerhard Lange received a number of awards, among them the "Frederic W. Goudy Award" (1989), the "TDC-Medal" of the Type Directors Club New York (2000), the Design Prize of the City of Munich (2003), and was honorary member of numerous professional associations (AGD, BDG, tgm).

His colleague Dieter Hofrichter remembered him as being particularly interested in revivals of classic designs: "His early typefaces were his own designs — in the 1950s he made several fonts in the style of the times, mostly calligraphic in character. At some point he stopped doing original designs and went on to produce only new editions of classic faces, or to revise — and usually improve — designs by others. In fact, Lange was not very interested in new designs. He simply wanted the fonts that were released to be very well made — in particular the “classics”. That was his main ambition: any fonts that were submitted were improved under his scrutiny."

== Typefaces ==
- Arena (1951, 1952, 1954, 1959, 1991)
- Derby (1952)
- Solemnis (1953)
- Boulevard (1954)
- Champion (1957)
- El Greco (1964)
- Concorde (1969)
- Concorde Nova (1975)
- Imago (1982, 2000)
- Akzidenz-Grotesk, (forerunner of Helvetica)
- Franklin-Antiqua (1976)
- Garamond (re-cut) (1972, 1975)
- Walbaum (re-cut) (1975, 1976, 1978, 1979)
- Caslon (re-cut) (1977, 1982)
- Berthold Script (1977)
- Baskerville (re-cut) (1980, 1983)
- Berthold Bodoni Old Face (1983, 2001)
- Whittingham (2000)
