= Justus Erich Walbaum =

German typefounder and punchcutter

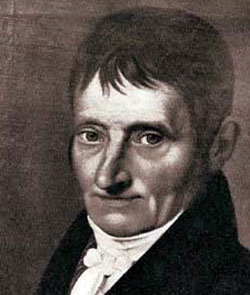
- Born: 25 January 1768
- Died: 21 June 1837 (aged 70)

Justus Erich Walbaum (25 January 1768 – 21 June 1837) was a German typefounder and punchcutter of the late 18th and early 19th centuries. (Note: Some prominent sources give 1839 as a date of death; 1837 is the date given in specialist sources such as Bruchmann, his biographer Bohadti and Steiner & Stillmark.)

Walbaum was a punchcutter, who carved steel punches used as a master to stamp matrices, the moulds used to cast metal type. Walbaum was born in Steinlah, a district of the town of Haverlah in modern Lower Saxony. Based first in Goslar and later in Weimar, he created type in the Didone style, also known as the 'rational' or 'modern' style. This style, inspired by the work of type designers such as the Didot family and Giambattista Bodoni, involved a sharper contrast between thick and thin strokes than was used previously, and a more modular design abstracted from handwriting. Jan Tschichold described his designs as 'the most beautiful German version' of modern type. He also created type in the Fraktur style of blackletter.

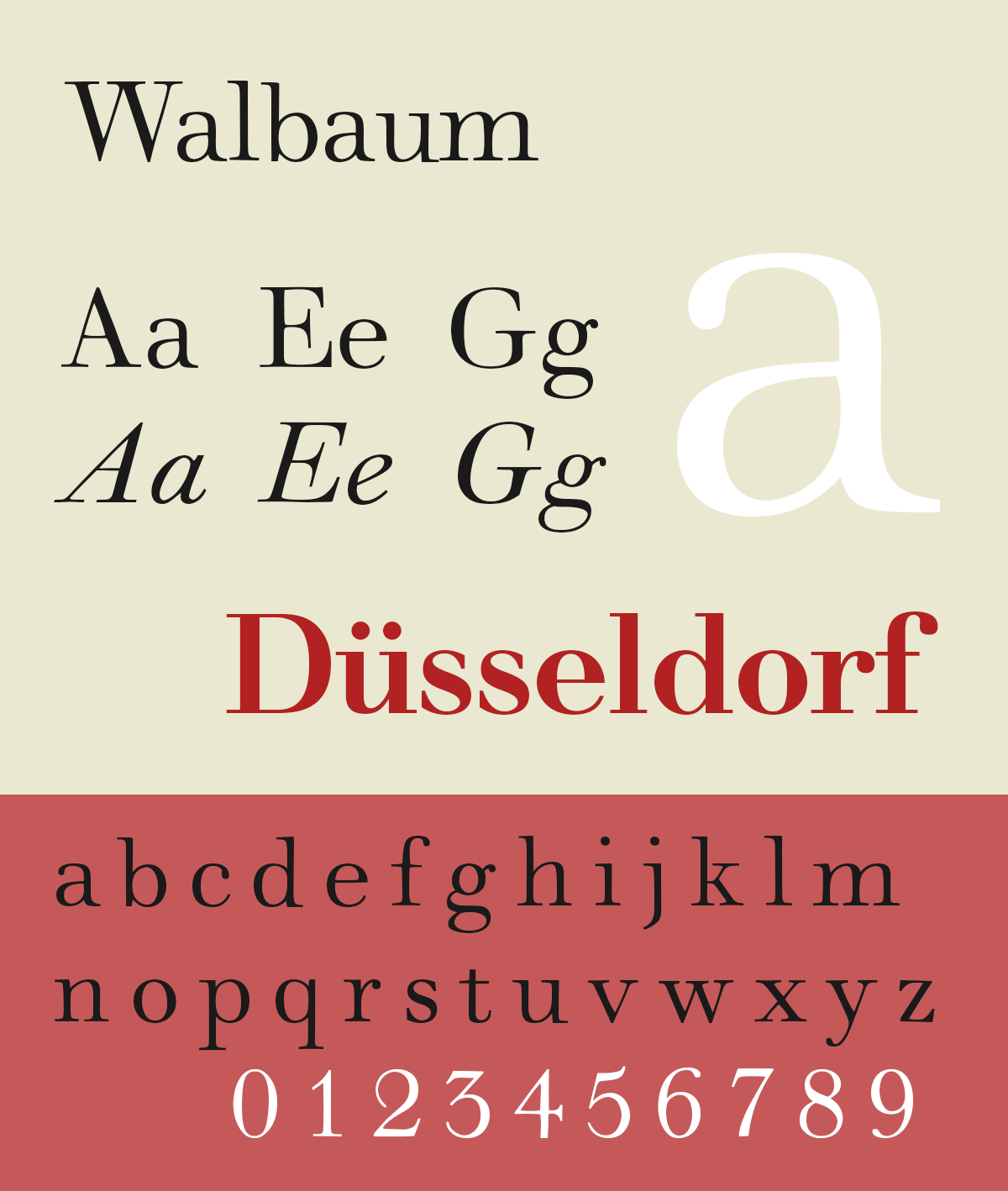
Walbaum's roman typeface, released in around 1800

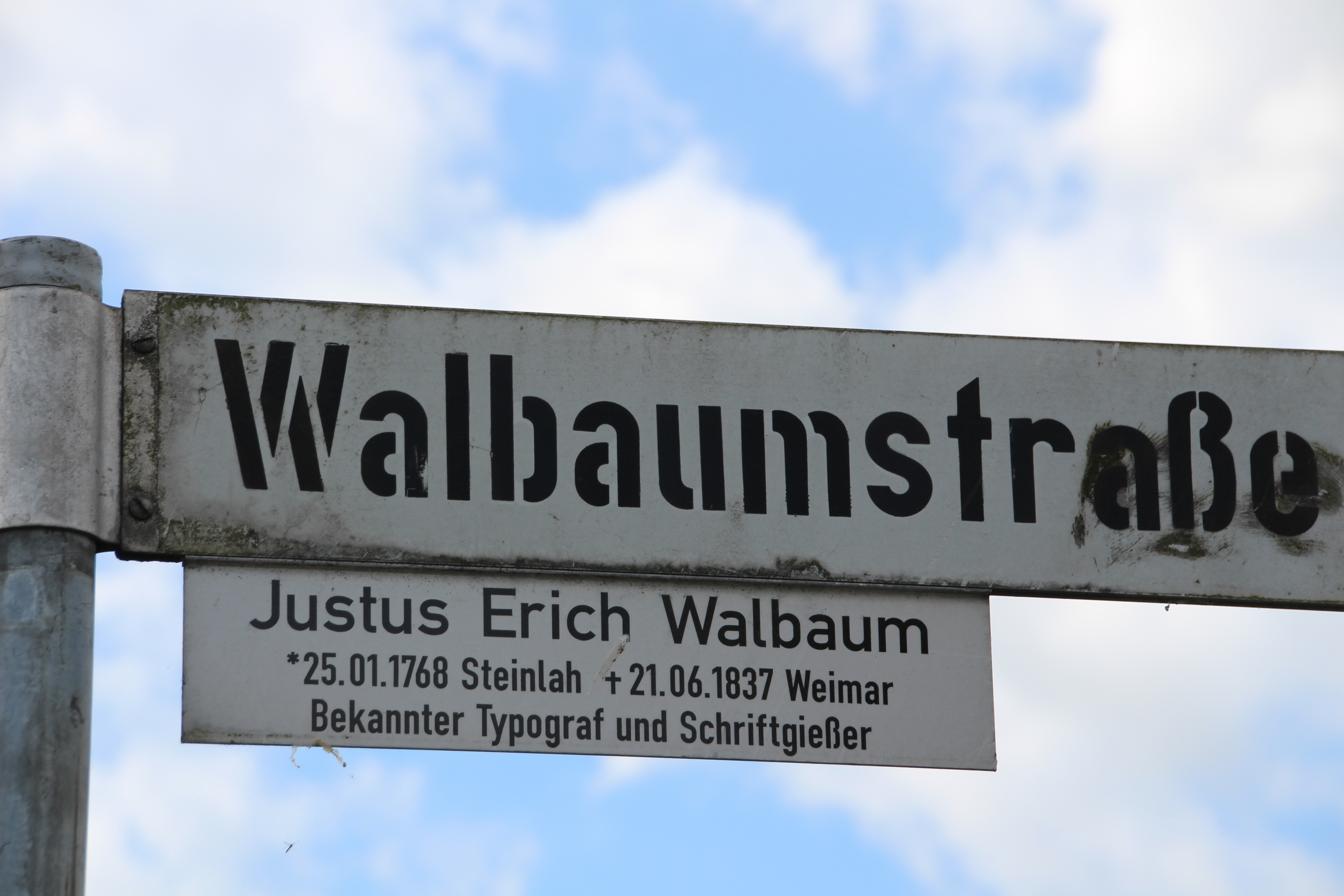
Justus Erich Walbaum Straße, a street named after Walbaum in his birthplace of Steinlah. None of this lettering uses his fonts, but rather DIN 1451 or a variant of it below and stencilled lettering above.

Walbaum was the son of a clergyman, Johann Erich Walbaum. Initially apprenticed to a grocer and confectioner, he became interested in engraving through working to make moulds for confectionery. After briefly working for the publisher Johann Peter Spehr as an engraver, he received a concession to set up a type-foundry in Goslar in 1796, in 1802 moving it to Weimar where there was more of a market for his work.

Walbaum's original intention was to pass his business onto his son Theodor, who took over its running from 1828, but with the unexpected death of Theodor in July 1836 he sold the concern to the publisher F.A. Brockhaus AG, who later sold materials to H. Berthold AG in 1918.

Walbaum's style of type was influential in his lifetime and the following century. It became less popular in the twentieth century due to a change in taste which preferred 'old-style' serif letterforms, based on printing before the nineteenth century, although it was extensively used by the artisanal Curwen Press in London. However, revivals have been created by Monotype, Linotype, Berthold and others in the twentieth century, and by František Štorm more recently.
