= Frank-Rühl =

Typeface

Frank-Rühl is one of the most prominent Hebrew typefaces, designed by Rafael Frank between 1908 and 1910. It was originally issued by the C.F. Rühl foundry in Leipzig as "Frank-Rühl-Hebräisch".

== History and design ==
Rafael Frank (1867–1920), a German-Jewish typographer, for the C.F. Rühl foundry in Leipzig. The foundry later merged with the H. Berthold AG in Berlin. The typeface was released between 1908 and 1910. The typeface was intended to modernize Hebrew printing, making it more suitable for secular texts while still adhering to traditional Jewish typographic norms. Frank also designed the font Miryam. In designing his alphabet, he drew inspiration from the style of the earliest prints, particularly those from Venice, and made noticeable adjustments to similar-looking letters for educational clarity. The typeface quickly gained popularity and was widely adopted by printing houses across Europe. It became the standard for Hebrew printing, especially in newspapers and books.

A sample of the typeface

== Distribution today ==
Several digital versions of Frank-Rühl have been created, including FrankRuehl (Kivun Computers Ltd.), Frank Ruehl BT (Bitstream), and Frank Ruhl Libre (Fontef).
