= Berthold Type Foundry =

German type foundry

H. Berthold AG
- Type: Aktiengesellschaft
- Industry: Type foundry
- Founded: 1858; 168 years ago (original); 1996; 30 years ago (relaunch)
- Founder: Hermann Berthold
- Defunct: 1993; 33 years ago (original)
- Headquarters: Berlin, Germany
- Key people: Hermann Berthold; Günter Gerhard Lange; Harvey Hunt
- Parent: Monotype Imaging
- Website: bertholdtypes.com at the Wayback Machine (archived 2004-06-05)

H. Berthold AG was a German type foundry. It was one of the largest in the world for most of the modern typographic era, making the transition from foundry type to cold type successfully and only coming to dissolution in the digital type era.

== History ==
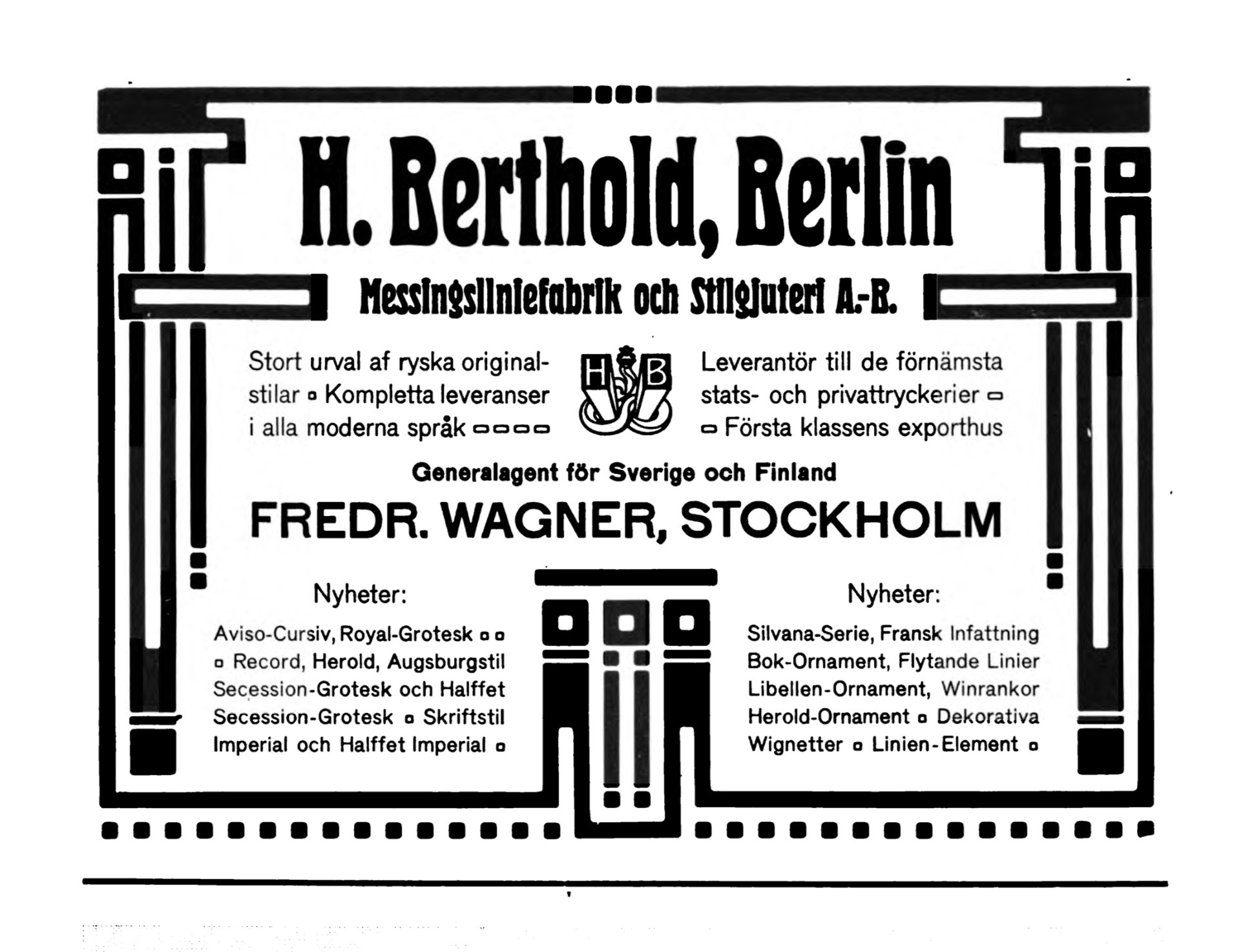
A 1905 advertisement for Berthold in a Swedish printing journal, showcasing its Herold typeface

H. Berthold was founded in Berlin in 1858 by Hermann Berthold, initially to make machined brass printer's rule. It then moved into casting metal type particularly after 1893. The company played a key role in the introduction of major new typefaces and was a successful player in the development of typesetting machines. The production premises were on Wilhelmstrasse No. 1 until 1868, and then on Mehringdamm 43. In 1979 the factory moved to another location between Teltow Canal and Wiesenweg in Lichterfelde.

The H. Berthold foundry's most celebrated family of typefaces is arguably Akzidenz-Grotesk (released 1898), an early sans-serif which prefigured by half a century the release of enormously popular neo-grotesque faces such as Helvetica. In 1950, type designer Günter Gerhard Lange embarked upon a long affiliation with the company, for which he designed various original typefaces, including Concorde and Imago, and oversaw the foundry's revivals of classic faces such as Garamond, Caslon, Baskerville, and Bodoni.

In 1996, Harvey Hunt (1949–2022) and his wife Melissa, claimed to have reestablished the company as Berthold Types. However, there is no evidence to support that this was a reestablishment. The bankrupt company had incredible debts, and any legal successors would have had to take on those debts. As no one was interested in taking over those debts, the bankruptcy court in Berlin decided to liquidate the company. There is no legal successor.

In 1997, Berthold Types acquired all of the copyright, trademark and design rights associated with the Berthold Exklusiv Collection. Günter Gerhard Lange, Berthold Exklusiv Collection type director during H. Berthold AG era, worked for Berthold Types Limited as an exclusive artistic consultant until his death in 2008.

Following Harvey Hunt's death, Monotype announced the acquisition of Berthold Types's inventory of typefaces (but not legal entity) in August 2022.

=== Lawsuit controversy ===
During Harvey Hunt's tenure at Berthold Types Limited, the company was accused of sending (frivolous) legal letters usually related to alleged trademark violations. This led to discussions of issues of Berthold not paying the original designers, such as Albert Boton.

== Cold Type ==
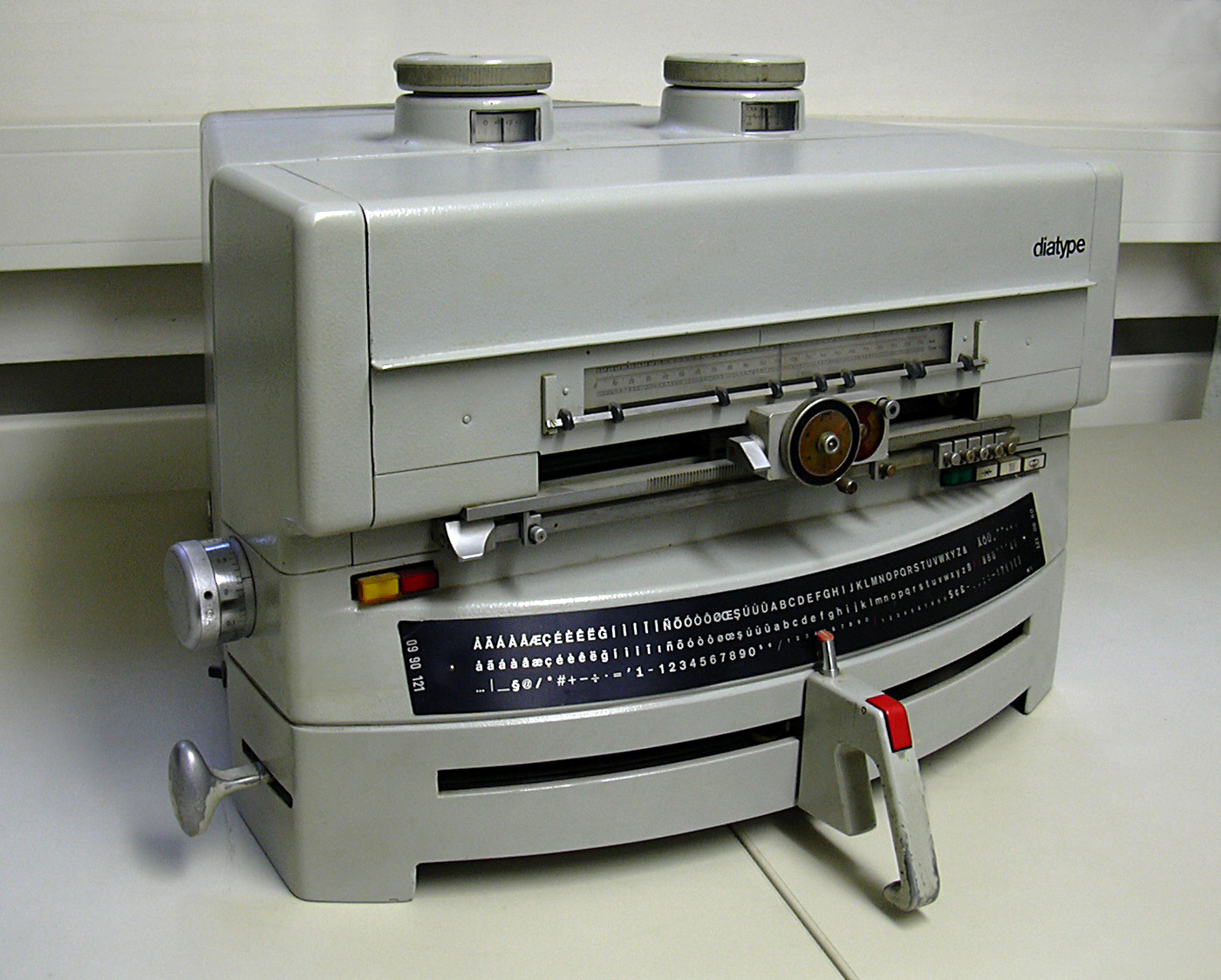
A Berthold Diatype machine

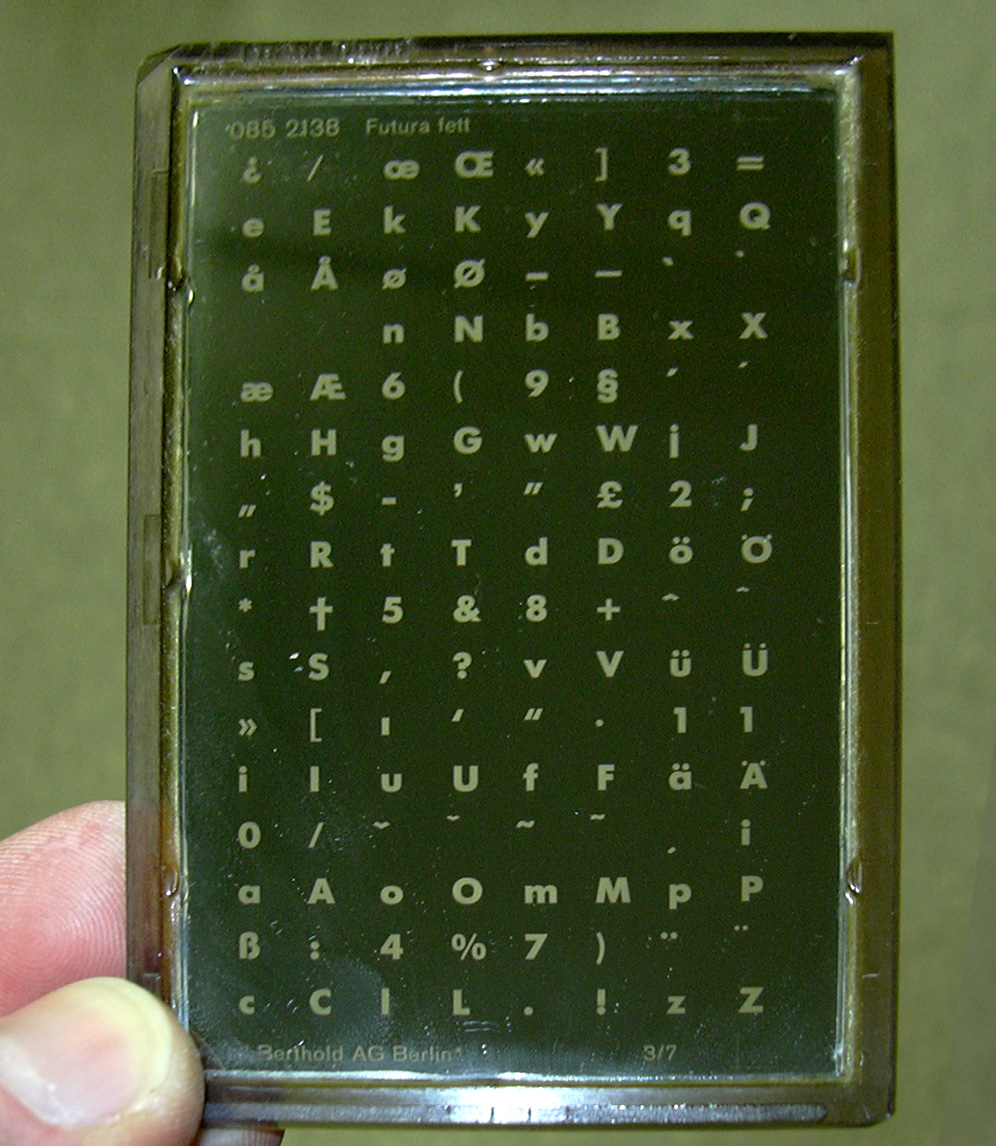
A Diatronic plate, showing Futura

As a typefounder, Berthold had no background in producing cold type machinery until the introduction of the Diatype in 1958.

The Diatype was a relatively small desktop-sized headline-setting device (i.e. not intended for continuous justified text), based on a glass disc font master. Character selection was by means of a trigger mounted on the front of the machine (giving rise to the colloquial naming of the machine as the "duck-shooter" (in the UK at least).

When changing font, it was a notable feature of the machine that it required calibration of letter-spacing by the typing of a nonsense character sequence: "Hillimillihirtzheftpflasterentferner". Measuring the width of this 'word' at a specific font size would indicate if the character width and spacing was set correctly.

== Digital Type ==
=== Diatronic ===
Berthold Diatronic systems were based on a glass grid master of each font weight, composed on a code-driven system. A marching-character display provided editing capabilities only to the line currently being composed.

=== Berthold ADS (Akzidenz Dialog System) ===
The next incarnation of the Diatronic system was widely adopted in the high-quality ad setting trade in Europe. Its major advantage was fine control of typography thanks to continuously variable optics, allowing fractions of point sizes to be specified. Operator feedback was by means of a green-screen CRT display showing code mnemonics only, it being left to the operator to visualise final output. Keyboard operation was innovative, utilizing many keys with a single legend, such as <job>, <begin>, <set>, <end>, etc. System operation was therefore effected by a combination of keys, such as <job>, then <end> to save a file.

== Typefaces ==
These foundry types were produced by Berthold:

- Akzidenz-Grotesk (1898)
- Arena (1951-1959, G. G. Lange)
- Ariston (1933-1936, Martin Wilke), cut in a light, medium, and bold.
- Augustea (1905-25)
- Bayer Type (1935, Herbert Bayer)
- Block (1908)
- Boulevard (1955, G. G. Lange)
- Brudi Mediaeval (1953-54, Walter Brudi)
- Caprice (1939, Martin Wilke)
- Champion (1957, G. G. Lange)
- City (1930, Georg Trump)
- Concorde (1968, G. G. Lange), also offered for machine composition by Intertype (Berlin).
- Derby (1953, G. G. Lange)
- El Greco (1964, G. G. Lange)
- Formata (1984, 1988, Bernd Möllenstädt)
- Frank-Rühl (1908, Rafael Frank)
- Herold, a late nineteenth-century face.
- Palette (1951, Martin Wilke).
- Picadilly (1968, Martin Wilke)
- Solemnis (1954, G. G. Lange)

== Cold Typefaces ==
These types were produced for photo-composition by Berthold:

- Imago (1982, G. G. Lange)
