= Luke Geissbühler =

American cinematographer

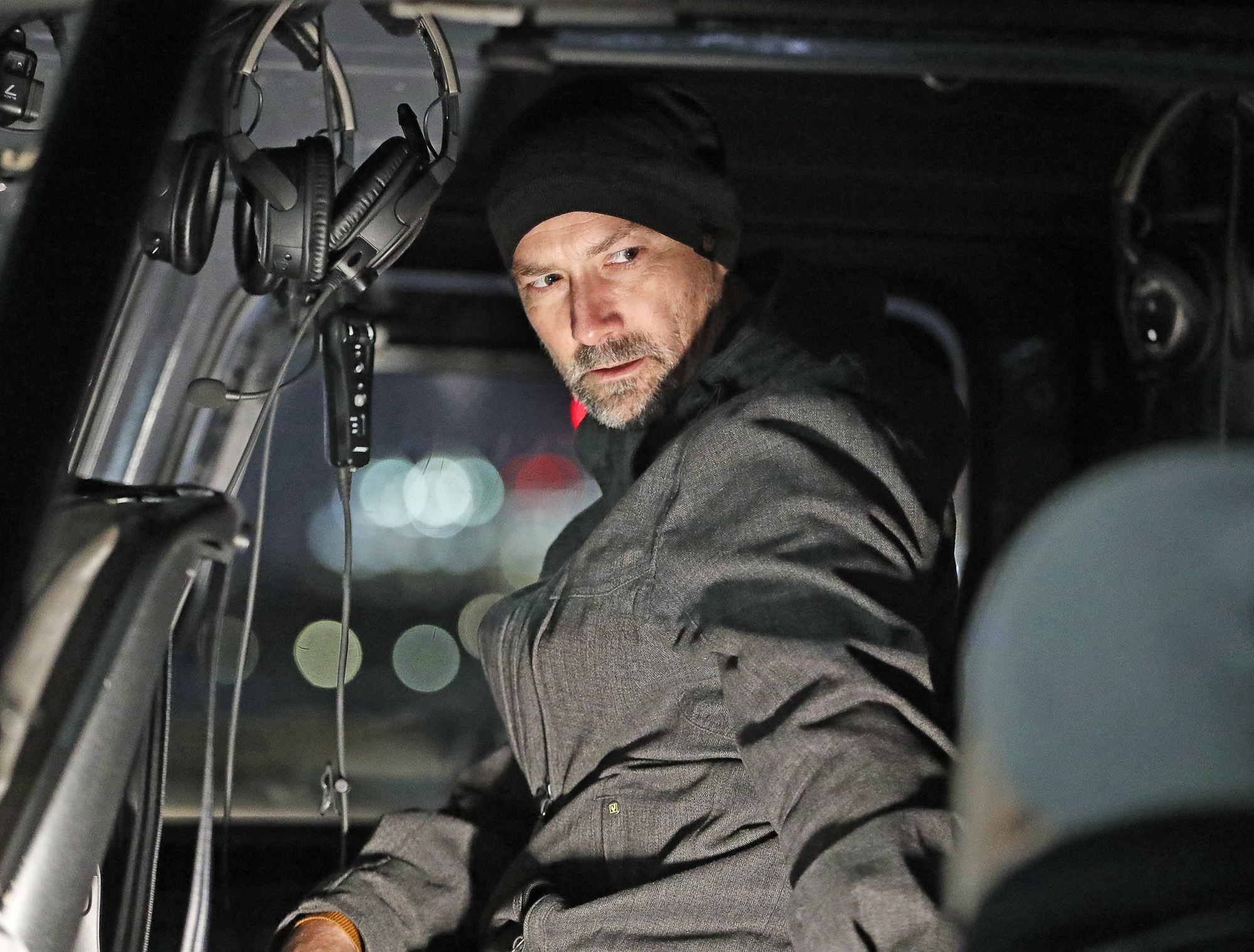
- Born: January 21, 1970 (age 56); Philadelphia, Pennsylvania, U.S.
- Occupation: Cinematographer
- Years active: 1996–present

Luke Geissbühler is an American cinematographer and producer, with a body of work based mostly on documentary works.

== Life and career ==
Luke Geissbühler, son of renowned graphic designer Steff Geissbühler, was born in Philadelphia, Pennsylvania and currently lives in Brooklyn, New York. He graduated from New York University's Tisch School of the Arts with a BFA in Film and Television. He has received an Academy Award nomination for his work as cinematographer and producer on the short film, Time Freak, as well as receiving an Emmy Award for Street Gang, HBO's 2021 documentary about the beginnings of Sesame Street. In 2010, Geissbühler built a homemade spacecraft with his son Max that quietly recorded a trip through the blackness of space and returned safely back to earth, as chronicled in the viral video, Space Balloon.

== Filmography ==
=== Film ===
Year	Title	Director	Notes
1997	Headless	Elizabeth Donius; Amy C. Elliott	
2000	Killing Cinderella	Lisa Abbatiello	
2001	Acts of Worship	Rosemary Rodriguez	
2003	Season of Youth	Eric Perlmutter	
2003	Justice	Evan Oppenheimer	
2004	Mail Order Wife	Huck Botko; Andrew Gurland	Role: Film crew
2005	Alchemy	Evan Oppenheimer	
2006	East Broadway	Fay Ann Lee	With Toshiaki Ozawa
2006	Borat	Larry Charles	With Anthony Hardwick
2006	Noon Blue Apples	Jay Lee	
2009	The Magnificent Cooly-T	Stephen Leeds	
2010	The Virginity Hit	Huck Botko; Andrew Gurland	
2011	The Speed of Thought	Evan Oppenheimer	
2013	The Frankenstein Theory	Andrew Weiner	Role: Luke Hill
2014	Bad Johnson	Huck Botko	
2014	Alien Abduction	Matty Beckerman	
2014	Match	Stephen Belber	
2014	Grace	Heath Jones	
2014	Sun Belt Express	Evan Buxbaum	
2015	Chloe and Theo	Ezna Sands	With Aaron Krummel and Peter Zeitlinger
2017	Stuck	Michael Berry	
2018	Breaking Brooklyn	Paul Becker	
2018	Time Freak	Andrew Bowler	
2020	Borat Subsequent Moviefilm	Jason Woliner	
2022	Follow Her	Sylvia Caminer	
2023	Robots	Casper Christensen; Anthony Hines	Also credited as co-producer
2026	The Schopenhauer Effect	Alexis Lloyd	
2026	Ali G: Who Iz I?	Sacha Baron Cohen	With Chris Darnell and Markus Mentzer

Direct-to-video

Year	Title	Director	Note
2008	Get Smart's Bruce and Lloyd: Out of Control	Gil Junger	With Dave Perkal

=== Television ===
Year	Title	Director	Notes
2020	Group	Alexis Lloyd	7 episodes
2008	A Muppets Christmas: Letters to Santa	Kirk Thatcher	TV movie

=== Documentary works ===
==== Film ====
Year	Title	Director	Notes
1999	Three Days	Kevin Ford; C.B. Smith (as Carter Smith)	Shared credit with Kevin Ford and Steve Gainer
2001	The Party's Over	Rebecca Chalkin; Donovan Leitch	With Brian C. Long, Ben Weinstein, Kevin Ford, C.B. Smith (as Carter Smith)
2005	Squonkumentary	Peggy Sutton	
2005	Bearing Witness	Barbara Kopple; Bob Eisenhardt; Marijana Wotton	With Joan Churchill and Richard Connors
2007	Helvetica	Gary Hustwit	Segment of Independent Lens
2007	Note by Note: The Making of Steinway L1037	Ben Niles	Shared credit with Ben Niles, Geoff O'Brien and Ben Wolf
2009	Charlie Haden	Reto Caduff	With Daniel Pfisterer
2009	Beyond Our Differences	Peter Bisanz	With John Mans
2009	Objectified	Gary Hustwit	Segment of Independent Lens
2010	Love Etc.	Jill Andresevic	
2011	Buck	Cindy Meehl	With Guy Mossman
2011	Urbanized	Gary Hustwit	
2011	The Visual Language of Herbert Matter	Reto Caduff	With Daniel Pfisterer
2014	A Lego Brickumentary	Kief Davidson; Daniel Junge	With Robert Muratore and Aaron Phillips
2015	Country: Portraits of an American Sound	Steven Kochones	
2016	Workplace	Gary Hustwit	
2016	Bruce Springsteen: In His Own Words	Nigel Cole	TV movie
2018	Elvis Presley: The Searcher	Thom Zimny	
2018	Fahrenheit 11/9	Michael Moore	With Jayme Roy
2018	Rams	Gary Hustwit	
2019	Funny You Never Knew	Andrew Hunt	With Manfred Reiff and Nancy Schreiber
2019	Who's Next?	Nancy Cooperstein	Also credited as producer
2021	Street Gang: How We Got to Sesame Street	Marilyn Agrelo	
2022	Keeper of Time	Michael Culyba	With Ben Wolf
2023	Apes Together Strong	Finley Mulligan; Quinn Mulligan	Shared credit with Finley Mulligan and Zach Voytas
2023	Ron Delsener Presents	Jake Sumner	
2024	Vice Is Broke	Eddie Huang	
2024	Takin' Care of Business	Tyler Measom	
2027	Pandamonium	Addison O'Dea	With Will Pugh and Lars Skree

==== Television ====
Reality TV

Year	Title	Director	Notes
2003	America's Next Top Model		Cycle 1
2005	Inner Chef with Marcus Samuelsson	Irad Eyal	

Documentary series

Year	Title	Director	Notes
2005	The Suite with Dave Karger	Himself	
2005	Party Girl	Irad Eyal; Marla Puccetti	
2006	Sensing Murder	Penny Fearon; Lisa Bloch; Mark Mori	3 episodes; Also directed episodes "Missing Teens" and "Prairie Predator"
2007-2009	Independent Lens	Ela Troyano; Gary Hustwit	3 segments
2013	Drunk History	Jeremy Konner	Episode "Boston"
2013-2015	Newsreaders		
2017	Abstract: The Art of Design	Richard Press	Episodes "Paula Scher: Graphic Design" and "Platon: Photography"
2017	Killing Richard Glossip	Joe Berlinger; Kevin Huffman	
2018	Who Is America?		
2018	Unspeakable Crime: The Killing of Jessica Chambers	Joe Berlinger	6 episodes
2018	The Victoria's Secret Fashion Show	Dee Koppang O'Leary	TV special
2018	Wrong Man		
2023	The Pike County Murders: A Family Massacre		
2024	Odysseus Returns	Seth Ward; James Younger	

Miniseries

Year	Title	Director
2017	Gone: The Forgotten Women of Ohio	Joe Berlinger; Catharine Park
2022	Conversations with a Killer: The Jeffrey Dahmer Tapes	Joe Berlinger
2023	Who Killed Robert Wone?	Jared P. Scott
2023	I Wanna Rock: The '80s Metal Dream	Tyler Measom
2025-2026	The Gilgo Beach Killer: House of Secrets	Jared P. Scott
