= Trumpettes USA =

American political organization

The Trumpettes USA are a group of wealthy female supporters of the American politician and businessman Donald Trump.

The Trumpettes were established in 2015 to support Trump in his 2016 presidential campaign. The Trumpettes USA were founded by Toni Holt Kramer. She had previously been a supporter of Hillary Clinton and once hosted a party for Clinton at her Bel Air residence. Kramer and her friend Terry Ebert-Mendozza established the Trumpettes USA on 15 September 2015 after meeting on a cruise holiday in the Mediterranean and feeling that they had "do something to bring out the women's vote". The 'USA' suffix was chosen to distinguish the group from the 'Trumpette' brand of socks. Kramer's friend Linda and her former American football player husband Fred Williamson joined the group as early supporters. Fred Williamson was described as the first 'Trumpster' by Kramer. Their first gala was held at The Beverly Hilton hotel in Beverly Hills, California. Other prominent early members include Nikki Haskell, Ann Turkel and Pat Boone. Gennifer Flowers is also a Trumpette.

The group has an official hand signal which is to place one finger on top of another to form a 'T'.

Another group, Trumpettes Global was established to support Trump. Glueck wrote that the rivalry between the two group was "expressed almost exclusively in passive-aggressive terms" at a 2016 meeting.

In 2018 Lara Trump described the Trumpettes as "absolutely incredible ... What they did across the country—not just in Florida—was phenomenal, and we appreciate them more than they’ll ever know".

== Analysis ==
Writing in The Times, Louise Callaghan described the Trumpettes as bringing their "collective PR whack of Bel Air fashion, big blowouts and diamonds the size of walnuts to buoy [Trump] up when times are hard". In Politico magazine Katie Glueck described them as "jewel-bedecked, ideologically flexible and even less politically correct than [Trump] is". Glueck felt that the Trumpettes were "a socioeconomic world away from the populist blue-collar workers" who were prominent supports of Trump in the 2016 United States presidential election. Writing for In Media Res, part of the Media Commons digital scholarly network, Laura E. Strait and Gretchen Soderlund of the University of Oregon described the Trumpettes as linked by their "overwhelming whiteness and blondeness" with all sharing "a notable confrontational charisma". Strait and Soderlund felt that the women had rejected traditional conservative "discourses of motherhood and morality in favor of a belief in the ruggedly flawed individualism" represented by Trump and that their primary drive was to uphold white supremacy which they do by "defending and absolving Republican men and doubling down on the racial and ideological requirements of white American citizenship".

== Events ==
Their January 2018 event "A Red, White & Blue Celebration for We the People" for 800 people at Mar-a-Lago was addressed by Jeanine Pirro. A February 2019 event was Country and Western themed with entertainment from Lee Greenwood. Attendees shouted 'Build the wall' and a special video message from President Trump congratulated the attendees as a "very special group of friends" and praised his recent negotiations with North Korea following the 2019 North Korea–United States Hanoi Summit. The comedian Roseanne Barr was the featured guest speaker at the Trumpettes third annual gala in 2019. Trump's son, Donald Trump Jr. also spoke at the event. The Australian mining magnate Gina Rinehart described herself as a Trumpette and watched the 2024 presidential election at a Mar-a-Lago party with Holt Kramer and Nigel Farage.

The Trumpette's November 2024 party for Super Bowl LVIII was their first event since 2020. Robert Davi, Mike Flynn, Marjorie Taylor Greene and Tom Homan were scheduled to attend. Holt Kramer described the event as "Mega MAGA". President Trump and the First Lady of the United States, Melania Trump attended. It was the couple's first public appearance at a political event since November 2022.
