= Norm (graphic design group) =

Swiss graphic design team

Norm (based in Zurich, Switzerland), is an experimental graphic design team best known for their typography. Their most influential project is typography for Cologne Airport. It is co-founded by two Swiss designers Dimitri Bruni and Manuel Krebs and later joined by Ludovic Varone. Their approach to typography is known to be very strict and rigorous with strong modernist features but with slight references to postmodernism.

Some of their typefaces are Simple (designed independently and then adapted for the design of the Cologne Airport), Normetica, and Replica. Norm was featured in the 2007 documentary about the Helvetica font directed by Gary Hustwit. Some Norm fonts are used by the Lineto digital font foundry co-founded by Cornel Windlin and Stephan Müller.

In 2020 there was an exhibition of norm typefaces and their uses in the Museum für Gestaltung Zürich.
