= Andrew Blauvelt =

Japanese-American curator

Andrew Blauvelt (born West Point, NY in 1964) is a Japanese-American curator, designer, educator, and writer. Since 2015 he has served as director of the Cranbrook Art Museum in Bloomfield Hills, Michigan.

== Biography ==
Blauvelt received an MFA in design from Cranbrook Academy of Art in 1988, and a BFA from the Herron School of Art, Indiana University in 1986.

He is a trained graphic designer and served as Senior Curator, Design, Research, and Publishing at the Walker Art Center in Minneapolis, Minnesota from 2013 to 2015. Blauvelt's earlier positions at the Walker are Curator of Architecture and Design and Chief of Communications and Audience Engagement, Design Director from 1998 to 2010, and design director and curator since 2005.

According to London's Design Museum, "Blauvelt is one of the most influential figures in US graphic design both as a practising designer and as a creative director commissioning other designers' work." The Walker Art Center received a National Design Award from the Cooper-Hewitt National Design Museum of the Smithsonian Institution in 2009 for Institutional and Corporate Achievement.

Blauvelt was formerly the director of graduate studies and chair of the Graphic Design Department at the College of Design, North Carolina State University. He is a contributor to Design Observer. He also appeared in Gary Hustwit's 2009 film Objectified.

In 2005, Blauvelt and his team collaborated with Eric Olson of Process Type Foundry to create Walker Expanded, a novel graphic identity system for the Walker Art Center, which is a set of fonts that sets entire words and textures instead of individual letterforms and characters. The identity builds upon a history of experimental identity systems at the Walker, such as the one created in 1995 by type designer Matthew Carter, "whose Walker typeface, created specially for the Walker Art Center, is not only renowned for its pleasing appearance and legibility but is seen as one of the most innovative typefaces of the 1990s."

In 2011, Blauvelt co-curated the exhibition Graphic Design: Now in Production. This exhibition explored graphic design work from 2000 to 2010. In 2015, he curated the exhibition, Hippie Modernism: The Struggle for Utopia that surveyed the art, architecture, and design of the countercultural period (1964–1974) and edited its accompanying catalogue.

Blauvelt left the Walker Art Center in 2015 when became the director of the Cranbrook Art Museum.

Blauvelt was curator at large for the Museum of Arts and Design in New York from 2018 to 2022 while still working at Cranbrook.

In 2019, Blauvelt was named Curator-at-Large for design at the Museum of Arts and Design (MAD). One of his first exhibits at MAD was Too Fast to Live, Too Young to Die, focusing on punk graphics created between 1976 and 1986.

In 2021, Blauvelt worked With Eyes Opened: Cranbrook Academy of Art Since 1932. This project culminated with a nine gallery installation with 275 pieces from different time periods.

In 2022, Blauvelt was recognized and awarded the AIGA medal for his work in the arts and in helping reframe the image of museums within our current time.
