= Helvetica (film) =

2007 American documentary film

- Directed by: Gary Hustwit
- Produced by: Gary Hustwit
- Cinematography: Luke Geissbühler
- Edited by: Shelby Siegel; Laura Weinberg
- Music by: Kristian Dunn
- Production companies: Swiss Dots; Veer
- Release date: 12 September 2007
- Running time: 80 minutes
- Country: United States
- Language: English

Helvetica is a 2007 American independent feature-length documentary film about typography and graphic design, centered on the Helvetica typeface. Directed by Gary Hustwit, it was released in 2007 to coincide with the 50th anniversary of the typeface's introduction in 1957 and is considered the first of the Design Trilogy by the director.

== Synopsis ==
Helvetica is a documentary that interviews many graphic designers involved in the history or modern usage of the Helvetica typeface. The initial interviews discuss the original creator Eduard Hoffmann, and his goals for creating a clean, legible type relating to the ideals of the Modernist movement. Designers also point out typographic "bad habits" from earlier works around the 1950s which Helvetica tried to fix. For example, illegible hand-made lettering and cramped cursive.

Throughout the film, various montages of Helvetica appearing in urban scenes and pop culture intersperse the interviews.

Later, other interviewers point out criticisms of Helvetica. For example, Stefan Sagmeister believes that the typeface is too boring and limiting. David Carson, author of The End of Print: The Grafik Design of David Carson (1995), emphasizes the difference between legibility and good communication. He states that a hand-drawn font may be intentionally harder to read, to communicate emphasis to the reader. Other designers dislike Helvetica on the grounds of ideology. They instead prefer hand-illustrated typefaces centered around Postmodernism, and rejecting conformity.

Several interviews, including one of Michael Place, reveal a third stance on Helvetica. These designers-interviewees embrace its ubiquity and the challenge of making it "speak in a different way". Another high profile interview features Massimo Vignelli, who is responsible for the creation of directional signs for the New York City subway system. He too offers a nuanced position on the success and prominence of the typeface.

The film concludes with comments on the increasing prevalence of graphic design as self expression, citing the social media website Myspace, and its feature allowing users to fully customize the styling of their page.

== Interviewees ==
- Manfred Schulz
- Massimo Vignelli
- Rick Poynor
- Wim Crouwel
- Matthew Carter
- Alfred Hoffmann, Eduard Hoffmann's son
- Mike Parker, Linotype's typographic development director
- Otmar Hoefer
- Bruno Steinert
- Hermann Zapf
- Michael Bierut
- Leslie Savan
- Tobias Frere-Jones
- Jonathan Hoefler
- Erik Spiekermann
- Neville Brody
- Lars Müller
- Paula Scher
- Stefan Sagmeister
- David Carson
- Experimental Jetset
- Michael C. Place
- Norm

== Production ==
Hustwit explained that the film was created as a response to the lack of content regarding fonts as a whole, describing an urge to celebrate and acknowledge typographical graphic designers.

== Release ==
Helvetica premiered at the South by Southwest Film Festival in March 2007. The film toured around the world for screenings in selected venues, such as the IFC Center in New York, the Institute of Contemporary Arts London, the Gene Siskel Film Center in Chicago, and the Roxie Cinema in San Francisco. Helvetica was nominated for the 2008 Independent Spirit's Truer than Fiction Award.

Bands and musicians that contributed to the documentary's soundtrack include Four Tet, The Album Leaf, Kim Hiorthøy, Caribou, Battles, Sam Prekop of The Sea and Cake, and El Ten Eleven.

An edited version of the film was broadcast in the UK on BBC One in November 2007, as part of Alan Yentob's Imagine series. It aired in January 2009 as part of the Independent Lens series on PBS in the United States.

=== Critical reception ===
Film critics praise the film for its creative direction, both in how it uses sequences and cinematography to portray its point of view, and how the film invests its audience in a topic most would not consider immediately interesting. However, some in the graphic design field find the documentary lacking in its acknowledgement of history. One described the context the movie did not elaborate on, and explained that not only was it relevant, but almost mandatory to truly explain the rise of Helvetica as a font.

On review aggregator website Rotten Tomatoes, the film holds an approval rating of 88% based on 17 reviews, with an average rating of 7.4/10.

=== Awards and nominations ===
In 2008, the documentary was nominated for "Truer Than Fiction Award" during the Independent Spirit Awards.

=== Home media ===
The film was released on DVD in November 2007 by Plexifilm.

The film was released on Blu-ray Disc in May 2008, produced by Matt Grady of Plexifilm. The limited (1,500 copies) edition includes Gary Hustwit's autograph. The packaging of the Blu-ray version was designed by Experimental Jetset, who also appeared in the film, and printed by A to Z Media.

== See also ==
- Objectified, a documentary film about industrial design, also by Gary Hustwit.
- Typeface (film)
- Moog (film), a documentary film about the analog synthesizer, directed by Hans Fjellestad.
