= Sunset Strip (2012 film) =

- Film poster
- Directed by: Hans Fjellestad
- Written by: Hans Fjellestad
- Produced by: Tommy Alastra; Donovan Leitch
- Distributed by: Vision Films
- Release date: March 16, 2012 (South by Southwest Film Festival)
- Running time: 96 minutes
- Country: United States
- Language: English

Sunset Strip is a 2012 documentary directed by Hans Fjellestad and produced by Tommy Alastra. The documentary explores the history of the mile and a half long stretch of road through West Hollywood known as Sunset Strip. It premiered at the South by Southwest Film Festival.

== Synopsis ==
The film begins with a poem recited by Mark Mahoney, and utilizes several celebrities to discuss the history of the Sunset Strip. The Sunset Strip was born during the Roaring Twenties as a dirt road connecting Hollywood's big studios to the new development known as Beverly Hills. The so-called strip was just outside of the city, and LAPD's jurisdiction, which provided the ideal environment for speakeasies, brothels, and crime of every level, but also led to much creativity. Using the stars who worked and found success there, this film explores the stories that make up the history of the Sunset Strip.

Much of the time spent is on the 1950-1970s era, but the film touches upon major events such as the Golden Age of Hollywood at Ciro's and the Trocadero, The Doors playing at the Whiskey-A-Go-Go and The Roxy, legends about Mickey Cohen, and the multiple influential rock artists who called that part of the city home.

== Production ==
Tommy Alastra Productions began shooting in 2010. The film features so-called "guerilla footage" (amateur shots, often from the crowd's perspective) of the Strip's club and rock and roll shows, and interviews shot in different locations. Conversation-style interviews about memories are used, as opposed to the traditional "talking at the camera" format of documentaries. As a result, the film eschews the more structured format of shaping its ideas.

Many of the interviews feature more than one actor or musician, and Tommy Alastra Productions compiled footage under multiple sources. It was a challenge to remove background noise, create smooth sound quality and ensure archival footage was presented clearly as a result.

== Celebrity appearances ==
Various musicians, movie celebrities, and personalities are asked about their experiences in and around the Sunset Strip, and their recollection of important moments (such as the shutdown of Tower Records).

- Jane's Addiction
- Cisco Adler, Musician
- Lou Adler, Producer
- Ahmed Ahmed, Actor
- Tommy Alastra
- Kenneth Anger, Director
- Robin Antin, Choreographer
- Isis Aquarian
- Tom Arnold, Actor
- Dan Aykroyd, Actor
- André Balazs, CEO & Hotelier
- Gerry Beckley, Musician
- Rodney Bingenheimer, DJ
- Bobby Blotzer, Musician
- Steven Blush
- D.J. Bonebrake, Musician
- Dewey Bunnell, Musician
- Edd Byrnes, Actor
- Carlos Cavazo, Musician
- Exene Cervenka, Singer & Artist
- Robert Carl Cohen
- Clifton Collins Jr., Actor
- Alice Cooper, Singer & Song Writer
- Sofia Coppola, Director
- Billy Corgan, Musician
- Robbie Crane, Musician
- Cherie Currie, Musician & Actress
- Clive Davis, Producer
- Warren Demartini, Musician
- Bob Denver (Archived), Actor
- Johnny Depp, Actor & Musician
- Pamela Des Barres
- Joe DiCarlo
- Phyllis Diller, Actress
- John Doe, Singer & Song Writer
- Stephen Dorff, Actor
- Taime Downe, Musician
- Carmen Electra, Actress
- Len Fagen
- Perry Farrell, Musician
- Brent Fitz, Musician
- Mick Fleetwood, Musician
- Peter Fonda, Actor
- Kim Fowley, Musician
- Pleasant Gehman, Musician
- Travis Haley
- Argus Hamilton
- Nikki Haskell
- James Heimann
- Paris Hilton, Actress
- Barney Hoskyns, Music Critic
- Anton Hosney
- Dom Irrera, Actor
- Laurie Jacobson
- Maz Jobrani
- Steve Jones, Musician
- Jeff Klein, Musician
- William Knoedelseder
- Robby Krieger, Musician
- Harvey Kubernik
- Art Kunkin
- Robert Landau
- Darren Leader
- Tommy Lee
- Lemmy
- Richard Lewis, Actor
- Courtney Love, Musician
- Hugh Hefner
- Mark Mahoney, Artist
- Method Man, Actor
- Dirty Martini, Exotic Dancer
- T.J. McDonnell
- Duff McKagan, Musician
- Larry Miller, Comedian
- Shanna Moakler, Actress
- Paul Mooney, Comedian
- Billy Morrison, Musician
- Mýa
- Dave Navarro, Singer & Songwriter
- Jack Osbourne
- Kelly Osbourne, Actress, Singer & Songwriter
- Ozzy Osbourne, Songwriter
- Sharon Osbourne
- Steel Panther
- Corey Parks, Actor
- Russ Parrish, Musician
- Stephen Pearcy, Musician
- Stephen Perkins, Musician
- Slim Jim Phantom, Musician
- Domenic Priore, Author
- Riki Rachtman, Radio Personality
- Ratt
- Keanu Reeves, Director & Musician
- Tim Reid, Actor & Director
- Josh Richman, Actor
- Mickey Rourke, Actor
- Ralph Saenz, Musician
- Joshua Sandoval, Musician
- Johnathon Schaech, Actor
- George Schlatter, Producer & Director
- Chelsea Schwartz
- Neil Sedaka, Musician
- Slash, Musician
- Smashing Pumpkins
- Matt Sorum, Musician
- Seymour Stein, Music Executive
- Stephen Stills, Singer & Songwriter
- Rachel Sterling, Actress
- Sharon Stone, Actress
- Dita Von Teese, Actress
- Joanna Theobalds
- Katie Wagner, Journalist
- Sheila Weller
- Willie Wilkerson
- X
- Billy Zoom, Musician
- Betty Rowland (actress), Actress

== Music ==
The documentary lists a total of 48 songs in the credits, ranging from "You Set the Scene" by Love to "The Trip" by Donovan as well as music from Ratt, X, The Pussycat Dolls and Jane's Addiction. Slash, Billy Corgan, Robbie Krieger of The Doors and Perry Farrell are all featured speakers in the documentary.

== Release and distribution ==
Sunset Strip debuted at the South by Southwest (SXSW) film festival in Austin Texas, The Cannes Film Festival in France and several others before being acquired by Showtime Networks and Netflix through Ben Silverman's Electus Distribution.

A special Collector's Edition DVD was also released, and contained bonus interviews from several celebrities, including Hugh Hefner, Dave Navarro, Ozzy Osbourne, Keanu Reeves, Alice Cooper and more.
