= Speed of thought =

Speed of thought may refer to:

- Nerve conduction velocity
- The Speed of Thought, a 2011 thriller film
