= El Ten Eleven =

American post-rock band

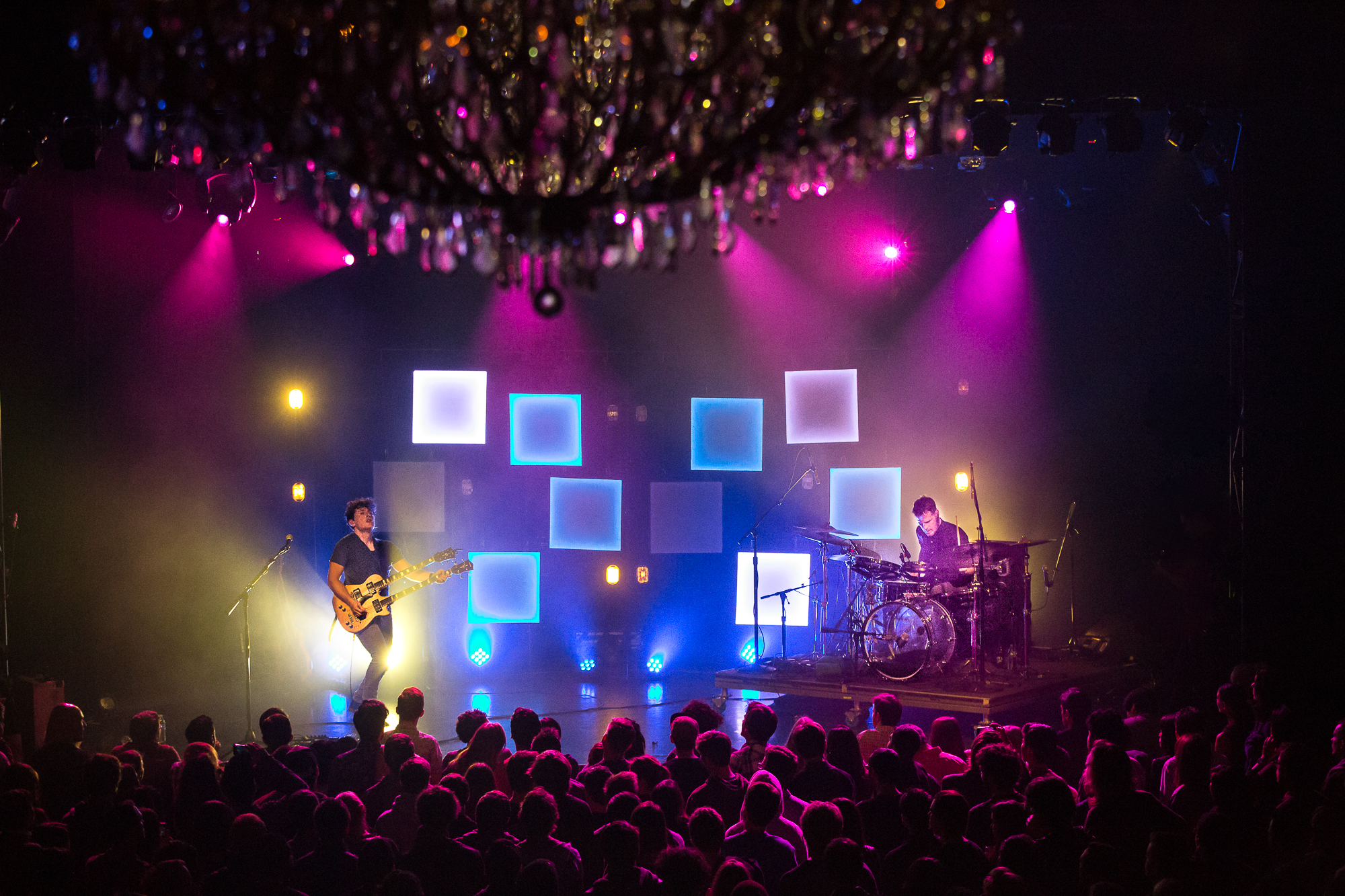
- El Ten Eleven at the El Rey Theater, Los Angeles, December 14, 2013

Background information
- Origin: Los Angeles, California, United States
- Genres: Post-rock, experimental, ambient, indie rock, math rock, progressive rock
- Years active: 2002–present
- Labels: Joyful Noise Recordings, Fake Record Label (US), Xtal (Japan)
- Members: Kristian Dunn; Tim Fogarty
- Website: www.elteneleven.com

El Ten Eleven is an American post-rock duo based out of Los Angeles, California. They are known for combining guitar/bass doubleneck or fretless bass, with heavy looping, or vamping, and the use of an effects pedal, over acoustic or electric drumming. They have released twelve full-length albums, 2 EPs and a remix album, earning generally positive reviews.

The band has earned some attention due to many of their songs being featured in the soundtracks of Gary Hustwit's design documentaries Helvetica, Objectified, and Urbanized.

The name El Ten Eleven is derived from the name of an airliner, the Lockheed L-1011 TriStar.

== Career ==
=== 2002-2007 ===
Bassist and composer Kristian Dunn and drummer Tim Fogarty formed El Ten Eleven in 2002 while living in the Silver Lake community of Los Angeles. They released their eponymous debut album, El Ten Eleven in 2004 on Fake Record Label, and through Bar/None Records on September 20, 2005. Many reviews of the album garnished the band with positive acclaim. Comparisons have been drawn to Sigur Rós and The Mercury Program, though reviews have heavily emphasized the duo's use of a limited number of musicians to create complex instrumental works. The Dallas Observer called them the fourth best instrumental band in the last twenty years. Spin, which awarded them the title 'Band of the Day', September 29, 2005, describes their work as "experimental instrumental music that's both highly skilled and deeply felt."

2005 also saw the band embark on their first US tour. This was the beginning of the band playing for years, almost non-stop, around the country. SF Weekly remarked of their live show, "Watching El Ten Eleven play is something like watching two superheroes do their thing." Regarding their live show, Dunn commented to the Scenestar in 2012, "We refuse to use prerecorded tracks live, so that means the live versions of the songs will be a little different from on the record."

In 2007, the movie Helvetica was released with original music by Kristian Dunn, and much of the contributed music performed by the duo. Their second album was also released that year, on CD format July 9, and then available later for download that August. A music video was also shot that year for the song "Hot Cakes", directed by video producer and writer Adam Hauck.

In late 2007, Xtal Records released the band's second full-length album, Every Direction Is North in Japan, a version which included the bonus track "Jumping Frenchmen Of Maine." In a January 28, 2008, blog post on their website, and MySpace page, the band released "Jumping Frenchmen of Maine" as an online download, stating that the song was from their forthcoming album. A PayPal link was included for listeners, giving them the option to pay any amount they wished for the song, much like what Radiohead had done with In Rainbows in 2007.

=== 2008–2010 ===
On July 15, 2008, the band released their third album, These Promises Are Being Videotaped, a more dance oriented outing. The record was recorded using only fretless bass and electronic and acoustic drums.

The band released their fourth studio album, It's Still Like a Secret, on November 9, 2010.

=== 2011–2013 ===
Their fifth album, Transitions, was released on October 2, 2012.

Transitions Remixed was released on April 2, 2013. It features remixes of songs from Transitions by electronic artists Com Truise, Slow Magic, D33J and Steed Lord, among others, and reached No. 13 on the CMJ college radio chart.

=== Since 2014 ===
On February 4, 2014 the band released For emily, a three-song EP dedicated to a friend who died the previous year. The word "emily" is purposely written in all-lowercase as that is the way she would write her name.

On July 18, 2014, the duo announced an Indiegogo campaign to fund the pressing of new vinyl records for their original album El Ten Eleven, Transitions, and a new pressing for For emily. For this fundraiser, fans could order any of vinyls for these three albums, the original test pressing records for these albums, or pay to be on the band's official guest list for life. Also, the For emily EP included an additional bonus track not available digitally called Favrile. The fundraiser ended on August 3, 2014.

Three years after the release of Transitions, the band announced the release of their sixth studio album, Fast Forward, via social media accounts. The album was released on August 21, 2015. Coinciding with the album's release, the band also planned a tour across the United States in support of the album following its release, including locations across the United States such as New York, Atlanta, California, and more. In 2017, 2018, and 2022, the band has been supporting Peter Hook and the Light on some of their concert dates. In 2018, they released Banker's Hill. The following year they signed with Joyful Noise Recordings, reissuing their debut LP. In 2020, they announced that their eighth full-length album Tautology would be released in September.

Tautology, a triple album, was released on September 18, 2020.

New Years Eve was released on March 4, 2022, and was followed less than a year later by Valley of Fire.

== Musical style ==
According to Paul Simpson of AllMusic, El Ten Eleven is an instrumental post-rock band with compositions that have been described as "bittersweet", "upbeat", and "complex". The band's sound is achieved through the use of fretless bass, a "double-neck bass/guitar combo", electronic drum kit, looping stations and effects pedals. The group's melodies are described as "chiming" and "heartfelt", and the songs themselves are described as "energetic, even danceable". Several of the band's songs are named after deceased friends and relatives.

== Discography ==
- El Ten Eleven (2004)
- Every Direction Is North (2007)
- These Promises Are Being Videotaped (2008)
- It's Still Like a Secret (2010)
- Transitions (2012)
- Transitions Remixed (2013)
- For emily EP (2014)
- Fast Forward (2015)
- Unusable Love EP (feat. Emile Mosseri) (2017)
- Banker's Hill (2018)
- Tautology I (May 2020)
- Tautology II (July 2020)
- Tautology III (September 2020)
- New Year's Eve (2022)
- Valley of Fire (2023)
- Nowhere Faster (2026)

== Band members ==
- Kristian Dunn – Wal fretless bass, 1977 and 1978 Carvin guitar/bass doublenecks, Schecter Robert Smith UltraCure VI six string bass, Shergold six string bass, Aria Pro II SB1000
- Tim Fogarty – electric drums, acoustic drums, drum pads

=== Side projects ===
Dunn and Fogarty used to be members of the San Diego–based band Softlightes, the first American band signed to the Australian label Modular Records.

Dunn recorded the debut LP, See You at the Solipsist Convention, for a new project under the band name Yesness with Damon Che of Don Caballero on Joyful Noise Recordings.
