= Cross Border Trio =

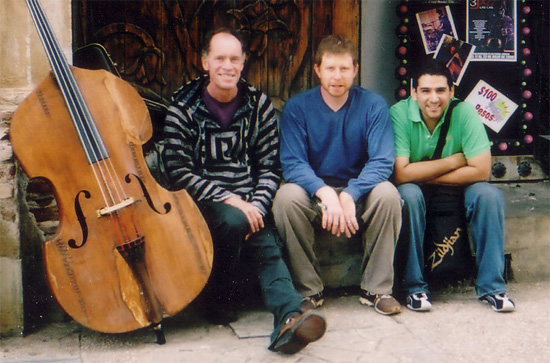
- Cross Border Trio (l to r: Rob Thorsen, Jason Robinson, Paquito Villa)

Background information
- Origin: United States and Mexico
- Genres: Jazz, Improvised music
- Years active: 2003 to the present
- Members: Jason Robinson (musician) (saxophone), Rob Thorsen (bass), Paquito Villa (drums)
- Past members: Joscha Oetz (bass)
- Website: http://www.crossbordertrio.com

Cross Border Trio is an international collaborate jazz group featuring American saxophonist Jason Robinson (musician), bassist Rob Thorsen, and Mexican percussionist Paquito Villa. Formed in 2003, the group has released an album, New Directions (2007/Circumvention), and toured extensively throughout Mexico and occasionally appeared in the United States. Since 2008, the group has featured a rotating cast of guest members and used the names of Cross Border Trio and X Border.

== Members ==
Jason Robinson (musician), saxophone
Rob Thorsen, bass
Paquito Villa, drums

== Guest members ==
Rick Helzer, piano
Joshua White, piano
Anthony Smith, piano and vibraphone

== Discography ==
- Cross Border Trio, New Directions (Circumvention, 2007)
