= Design Canada =

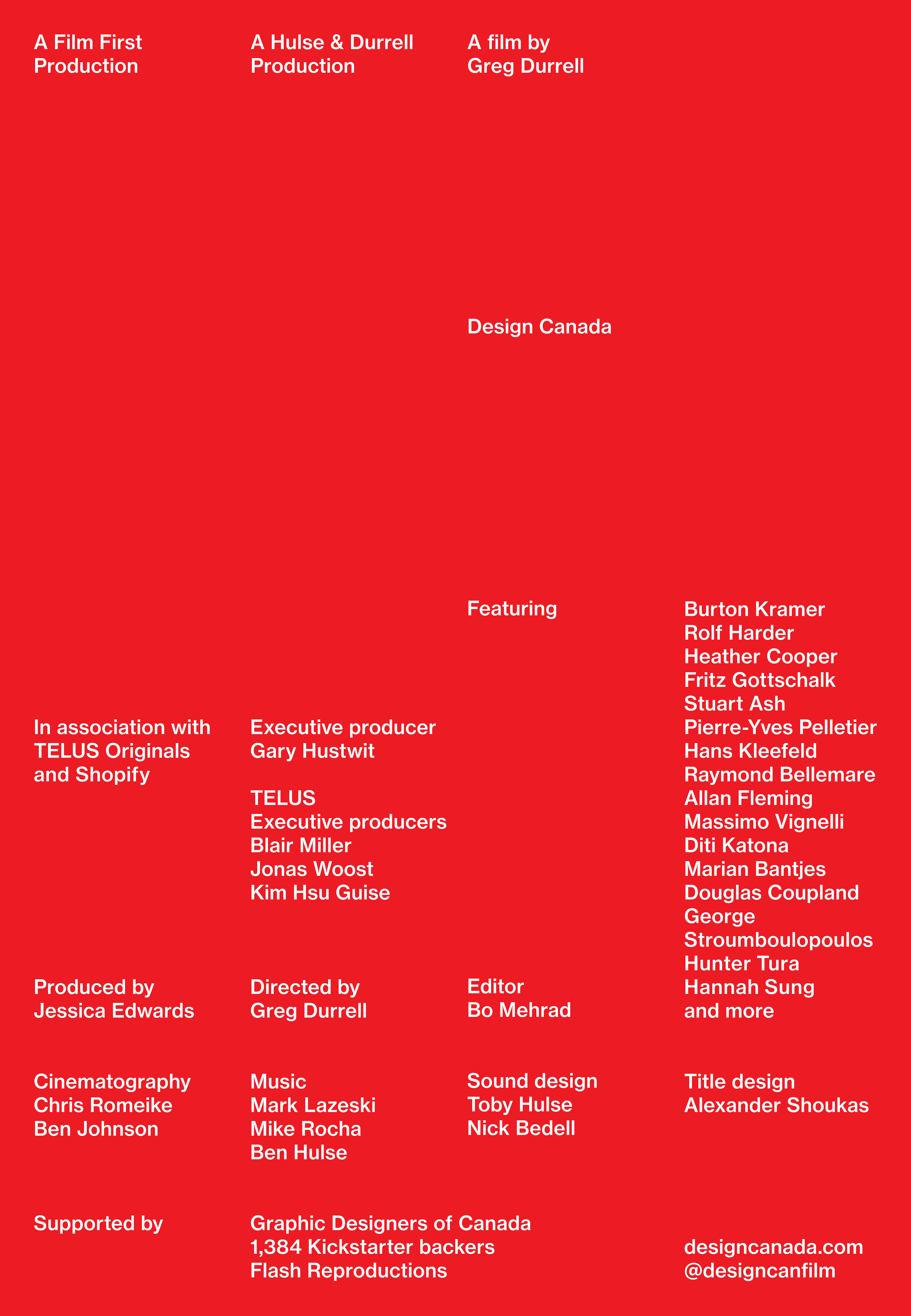
- Directed by: Greg Durrell
- Produced by: Jessica Edwards
- Cinematography: Ben Johnson; Chris Romeike
- Edited by: Bo Mehrad
- Music by: Mark Lazeski; Mike Rocha; Ben Hulse
- Release date: 2018
- Running time: 74 minutes
- Country: Canada
- Language: English

Design Canada is a 2018 Canadian documentary film by Vancouver-based designer Greg Durrell and produced by Greg Durrell of Hulse&Durrell, Vancouver; and Jessica Edwards and Gary Hustwit of Film First in Brooklyn, New York. The film recounts the untold story of graphics that "shaped Canada's identity" and iconography that "defined modern Canada"; these include the design of the Canadian flag and the Centennial symbol of Canada, the Canada wordmark, icons for National Film Board (NFB), Canadian Broadcasting Corporation (CBC), CN Rail, Air Canada, no name brand, the Roots beaver, Montreal Expos and the 1976 Summer Olympics. It explores works of a number of Canadian graphic designers in this domain.
