= Alan Cox (actor) =

British actor

- Born: Alan Douglas Cox; 6 August 1970 (age 56); Westminster, London, England
- Occupation: Actor
- Years active: 1976–present
- Parents: Brian Cox (father); Caroline Burt (mother)

Alan Douglas Cox (born 6 August 1970) is a British actor. He is known for portraying a teenage Dr. Watson in Young Sherlock Holmes in 1985.

== Life and career ==
Cox was born in Westminster, London, and is the son of Scottish Emmy Award-winning actor Brian Cox and his second wife, actress Caroline Burt. Cox was educated at St Paul's School in London. He has a sister, Margaret, and two half-brothers, Orson and Torin.

Cox portrayed the young John Mortimer the 1982 TV adaptation of his play A Voyage Round My Father, starring opposite Laurence Olivier. He is probably most widely known for his role in Young Sherlock Holmes (1985), where he played a teenage version of Dr. Watson. Other films include An Awfully Big Adventure (1995), Mrs. Dalloway (1997), and The Auteur Theory (1999). In 2011, Cox also co-starred as a nudist named Cory Beck in the independent comedy Act Naturally.

== Filmography ==
=== Film ===
| Year | Title | Role | Notes |
|---|---|---|---|
| 1976 | A Divorce | Jason | TV film |
| 1981 | If You Go Down in the Woods Today | Cub Scout | |
| 1982 | A Voyage Round My Father | Son as a Boy | TV film |
| 1982 | East Lynne | William Carlyle | TV film |
| 1984 | Man of Letters | Kenton | TV film |
| 1985 | Young Sherlock Holmes | John Watson | |
| 1995 | An Awfully Big Adventure | Geoffrey | |
| 1997 | Mrs Dalloway | Young Peter | |
| 1999 | The Auteur Theory | George Sand | |
| 2000 | Cor, Blimey! | Orsino | TV film |
| 2000 | Weight | Henry Salmon | |
| 2002 | Die Wasserfälle von Slunj | Donald Clayton | TV film |
| 2002 | The Dinosaur Hunters | Richard Owen | TV film |
| 2003 | Justice | Palm Sunday | |
| 2004 | Ladies in Lavender | Obsequious Man | |
| 2004 | Not Only But Always | Alan Bennett | TV film |
| 2006 | Elizabeth David: A Life in Recipes | Cuthbert | TV film |
| 2006 | Housewife, 49 | Dennis | TV film |
| 2008 | August | Barton | |
| 2009 | Margaret | Gordon Reece | TV film |
| 2010 | The Nutcracker in 3D | Gielgud | Voice role |
| 2011 | Act Naturally | Cory Beck | |
| 2011 | The Speed of Thought | Alexei | |
| 2012 | The Dictator | BP Executive | |
| 2018 | Staging the Knack and How to Get It | Interviewer | Short film |
| 2018 | Say My Name | Father Donald Davies | |
| 2019 | Act Super Naturally | Cory Beck | |
| 2026 | The Man with the Plan | The Devil | |

=== Television ===
| Year | Title | Role | Notes |
|---|---|---|---|
| 1978 | The Devil's Crown | Young Henry | Episode: "The Earth Is Not Enough" |
| 1979 | Penmarric | Young Jan-Yves | Episode: "Series 1, Episode 7" |
| 1980 | Shoestring | John | Episode: "The Dangerous Game" |
| 1983 | Jane Eyre | John Reed | Episode: "Gateshead" |
| 1990 | Casualty | Joshua | Episode: "Results" |
| 1991 | The Bill | Steve Doyle | Episode: "Stress Rules" |
| 1992 | Screen One | Seth Bade | Episode: "Adam Bede" |
| 1992 | Spatz | Graham | Episode: "Poetry & Music" |
| 1992 | London's Burning | Richard Sidwell | Episode: "Series 5, Episode 3" |
| 1992 | The Young Indiana Jones Chronicles | Dimitri | Episode: "Petrograd, July 1917" |
| 1994 | The Bill | Connor | Episode: "Creating a Market" |
| 1995 | Crown Prosecutor | David Ellery | Episode: "Series 1, Episode 8" |
| 1996 | Ellington | Tadeusz Zbinkiewicz | Episode: "No Holds Barred" |
| 1996 | The Thin Blue Line | Bob Tough | Episode: "Fly on the Wall" |
| 1997 | The Odyssey | Elpenor | Mini-series |
| 2004 | Midsomer Murders | Stephen Bannerman | Episode: "The Maid in Splendour" |
| 2007 | The Wild West | Mark Kellogg | Episode: "Custer's Last Strand" |
| 2008 | M.I. High | David DeHaverland | Episode: "It's a Kind of Magic" |
| 2008 | John Adams | William Maclay | Episode: "Unite or Die" |
| 2009 | The Bill | Phil Reaney | Episode: "Fall Out" |
| 2013 | Lucan | Ian Maxwell-Scott | Mini-series |
| 2014 | The Good Wife | Douglas | Episode: "Goliath and David" |
| 2015 | The Sonnet Project | | Episode: "Sonnet #30" |
| 2021 | New Amsterdam | Lyle | Episode: "More Joy" |

=== Theatre ===
| Year | Title | Role | Theatre |
|---|---|---|---|
| 2025 | Churchill in Moscow | Archie Clark Kerr | Orange Tree Theatre |

== Bibliography ==
- Holmstrom, John. The Moving Picture Boy: An International Encyclopaedia from 1895 to 1995. Norwich, Michael Russell, 1996, p. 381.
