= John & Paul & Ringo & George =

T-shirt design

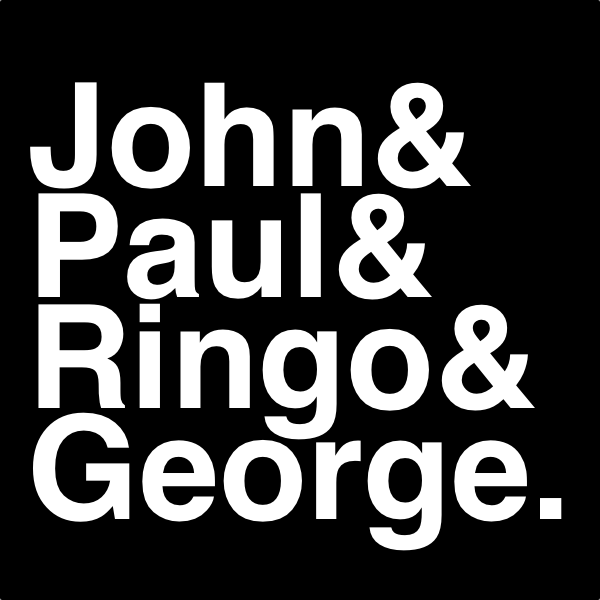
- John & Paul & Ringo & George.
- Designer: Experimental Jetset
- Year: 2001
- Type: T-shirt
- Material: Cotton

John & Paul & Ringo & George is a band T-shirt design with the names of The Beatles members: Paul McCartney, John Lennon, Ringo Starr and George Harrison. The shirt was designed by Dutch graphic design group Experimental Jetset for Japanese label 2K/Gingham in 2001.

The piece was designed as an "archetypal band shirt". A few months after releasing the Beatles shirt, Experimental Jetset released a Keith & Mick & Bill & Charlie & Brian version of the design for the Rolling Stones and a Joey & Dee Dee & Johnny & Tommy version for the Ramones.

== In popular culture ==
A derivative design listing the main characters from Animorphs.

The original run of T-shirts was popular and the design was quickly adapted and reused by others to reference other groups.

The design was adapted by McDonald's for a television advertisement for the Big Mac that ran during the 87th Academy Awards. It was also used in official political T-shirts for the presidential campaigns of Barack Obama and Donald Trump.
