= Trummerflora Collective =

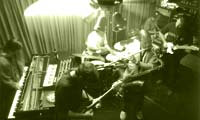
- Trummerflora Collective at the Space, Mission Hills, San Diego, California, circa 2001

Background information
- Origin: San Diego, California, United States
- Genres: Improvised music; Experimental music
- Years active: 2000-present
- Labels: Accretions; Circumvention
- Members: Marcos Fernandes; Curtis Glatter; Damon Holzborn; Nathan Hubbard; James Ilgenfritz; Sam Lopez; Joscha Oetz; Marcelo Radulovich; Jason Robinson; Scott Walton; Ellen Weller
- Past members: Kristy Cheadle; Lisle Ellis; Hans Fjellestad; Tracy McMullen; Robert Montoya; Al Scholl
- Website: trummerflora.com

The Trummerflora Collective is an experimental/improvisational music group formed in San Diego in 2000. In addition to performances and recordings by its core group of musicians, Trummerflora represents the center of a rich and diverse Southern California experimental music scene, including a variety of associated local artists, organizations and performance spaces. As a music collective, it is focused on providing a free, nurturing atmosphere for creative expression among its individual members as well as the group as a whole.

== History ==
Based on a mutual desire to provide a network of support for San Diego's experimental and improvised music community, Marcos Fernandes, Hans Fjellestad, Damon Holzborn, Robert Montoya, Marcelo Radulovich, and Jason Robinson established the Trummerflora Collective in the Spring of 2000. The collective grew out of performances at local spaces and events such as the Casbah, as well as the ...and the reindeer you rode in on compilation released in late 1999. By the end of 2000, Nathan Hubbard had joined the group.

In April 2001, the TFC released No Stars Please, a collection of live recordings produced throughout their first year through Accretions Records. Two more releases, Rubble 1 and Rubble 2, followed in the mid-2000s, described as "compilations featuring both individual and ensemble works." Various new members joined throughout this period, including Kristy Cheadle, Lisle Ellis, Curtis Glatter, Tracy McMullen, Joscha Oetz, Al Scholl, Scott Walton, and Ellen Weller.

In 2002, Trummerflora established the Spring Reverb festival, an annual event presenting music and art. By its second year, it had hosted performances by a variet of renowned experimental artists, including Eugene Chadbourne, Haco, Bill Horist, and Pamela Z. The festival would continue until 2009.

On the name Trummerflora, the collective cites eco-artists Helen and Newton Harrison: "Trummerflora, or rubble plants and trees, are a special phenomenon unique to heavily bombed urban areas. The bomb acts as a plow, mixing rubble fragments with the earth, which often contain seeds dormant for a century or more. These seeds come to light and those that can live in this new and special earth grow and flourish."

== Discography ==
- ...and the reindeer you rode in on (1999)
- No Stars Please (2001)
- Rubble 1 (2004)
- Rubble 2 (2006)
