= Mavis! =

- Directed by: Jessica Edwards
- Produced by: Jessica Edwards; Rachel Mills; Gary Hustwit
- Cinematography: Keith Walker
- Edited by: Amy Foote
- Music by: Mavis Staples; The Staple Singers; The Band; Bob Dylan; Jeff Tweedy
- Production company: Film First
- Distributed by: HBO
- Release dates: 15 March 2015 (Austin); 19 February 2016
- Running time: 80 minutes
- Country: United States
- Language: English

Mavis! is a documentary film about musician and civil rights activist Mavis Staples, directed by Jessica Edwards. The film premiered at the South by Southwest Film Festival in March, 2015, and was acquired for US broadcast by HBO.

== Cast ==
Mavis Staples
Yvonne Staples
Roebuck "Pops" Staples
Pervis Staples
Jeff Tweedy
Chuck D
Julian Bond
Bonnie Raitt
Bob Dylan
Levon Helm
Marty Stuart
Al Bell
Prince
Steve Cropper
Sharon Jones

== Critical reception ==
Mavis! has received mostly positive reviews from critics. Review aggregator Rotten Tomatoes gives the film an approval rating of 97%, based on 32 reviews, with an average rating of 6.9/10. Critic Joe Leydon, reviewing the film for Variety, called it "a spirited and captivating bio-doc that richly deserves the exclamation point in its title."

== Awards ==
The film won a 2016 Peabody Award.
