= Design Trilogy =

Series of documentaries by Gary Hustwit

The Design Trilogy is the collective name of a series of three documentary films about design directed by film director Gary Hustwit.

The films are:

- 2007: Helvetica, on the famous typeface of the same name
- 2009: Objectified, on industrial design
- 2011: Urbanized, on architecture and urban design

Later in 2013 through crowdfunding, Hustwit began editing and compiling transcripts of the interviews with his subjects into a book. It was subsequently completed and released in 2015.
