= Urbanized =

- Directed by: Gary Hustwit
- Produced by: Gary Hustwit; Lucy Raven
- Cinematography: Luke Geissbühler
- Edited by: Shelby Siegel; Michael Culyba
- Music by: Kristian Dunn
- Production company: Swiss Dots
- Release date: October 26, 2011
- Running time: 85 minutes
- Country: United States
- Language: English

Urbanized is a documentary film directed by Gary Hustwit and released on 26 October 2011. It is considered the third of a three-part series on design known as the Design Trilogy; the first being Helvetica, about the typeface, and the second being Objectified, about industrial design. The documentary discusses how cities are designed, and it features interviews with urban planners and architects, such as Oscar Niemeyer and Jan Gehl.

== Marketing ==
To promote the documentary, Hustwit commissioned a set of four limited edition posters based on four themes related to urban design.

== Reception ==
The film was well received by critics. Roger Ebert gave the film three out of four stars, calling it "an undertaking on an impressive scale" while suggesting that the documentary could have used more interviews of ordinary people. Writing for The New York Times, A.O. Scott compared the film to "a really good class taught by a team of enthusiastic professors," although he noted "a distinct bias in favor of [Jane Jacobs]-influenced new urbanism and against other approaches to city planning." TimeOut, meanwhile, called Urbanized "gorgeously photographed" while praising the film's interviews and Hustwit's ability "to make even the most banal of cityscapes appear appealingly utopian."
