= Robert Moog =

American electronic music pioneer (1934–2005)

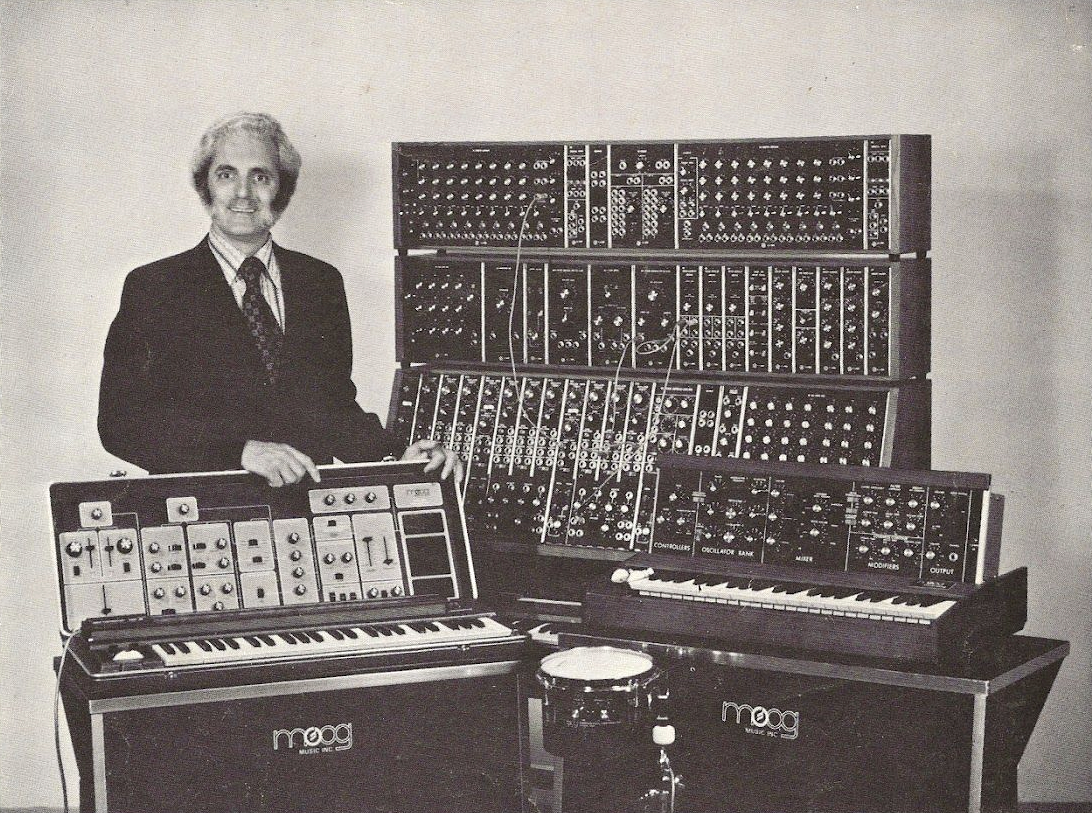
- Moog c. 1974
- Born: Robert Arthur Moog; May 23, 1934; New York City, U.S.
- Died: August 21, 2005 (aged 71); Asheville, North Carolina, U.S.
- Education: Queens College (BS); Columbia University (BS); Cornell University (PhD)
- Occupations: Electronics engineer; inventor
- Spouses: Shirley May Leigh (m. 1958; div. 1994); Ileana Grams (m. 1996)
- Children: 4
- Relatives: Florence Moog (aunt); Bill Moog (cousin)

Robert Arthur Moog (/moʊɡ/ MOHG; May 23, 1934 – August 21, 2005) was an American electronics engineer and electronic music pioneer. He was the founder of the synthesizer manufacturer Moog Music and the inventor of the first commercially-successful synthesizer, the Moog synthesizer, which debuted in 1964. In 1970, Moog released a more portable model, the Minimoog, described as the most famous and influential synthesizer in history. Among Moog's honors are a Technical Grammy Award, received in 2002, and an induction into the National Inventors Hall of Fame.

By 1963, Moog had been designing and selling theremins for several years while working toward a PhD in engineering physics at Cornell University. He developed his synthesizer in response to demand for more practical and affordable electronic-music equipment, guided by suggestions and requests from composers. Moog's principal innovation was the voltage-controlled oscillator, which uses voltage to control pitch. He also introduced fundamental synthesizer concepts such as modularity, envelope generation and the pitch wheel. He is credited with introducing synthesizers to a wider audience and influencing the development of popular music.

Moog pursued his work as a hobby, and he is regarded as a poor businessman. His only patent was on his transistor ladder filter design; commentators have speculated that he would have become extremely wealthy had he patented his other innovations, but that their availability in the public domain helped the synthesizer industry flourish.

In 1971, Moog sold Moog Music to Norlin Musical Instruments, where he remained as a designer until 1977. In 1978, he founded the company Big Briar, and in 2002 he renamed it Moog Music after reacquiring the rights to the name. In later years, Moog taught at the University of North Carolina at Asheville and continued designing instruments for the revived Moog Music. He died at the age of 71 in Asheville from a brain tumor.

== Early life and education ==
Robert Moog was born at Flushing Hospital in New York City on May 23, 1934. His father was George Conrad Moog, of German descent. His mother was Shirley (Jacobs) Moog, of Polish-Jewish descent. He was raised in Flushing, Queens.

When he was a boy, Moog's mother forced him to study the piano. He was active in the Boy Scouts, and especially enjoyed spending time with his father, a Consolidated Edison engineer, visiting Manhattan's Radio Row and working on radio and electronics projects. He became fascinated by the theremin, an electronic instrument controlled by moving the hands over radio antennae. In 1949, at the age of 14, he built a theremin from plans printed in Electronics World.

He graduated from the Bronx High School of Science in 1952. He earned a Bachelor of Science in physics from Queens College of the City University of New York in 1955, and a Bachelor of Science in electrical engineering from the Columbia University School of Engineering and Applied Science under a 3-2 engineering program in 1957. He earned a PhD in engineering physics from Cornell University in 1965.

== Career ==
=== Theremins and R.A. Moog Co. ===
In 1953, Moog produced his own theremin design, and in the following year, he published an article on the theremin in Radio and Television News. That same year, he founded R.A. Moog Co., building theremins and theremin kits in his parents' home and selling them via mail order. In 1956, Moog and his father visited Raymond Scott's Manhattan Research facility, and Scott purchased a Moog Model 305 theremin. Scott rewired the Moog theremin to be controlled by a keyboard, dubbing his creation the Clavivox. Moog married in 1958 and continued building and selling theremin kits from his own home in Ithaca, before establishing the company's first commercial space at 41 East Main Street in Trumansburg, New York in 1963, all while continuing to pursue his postgraduate education.

=== Moog synthesizer ===
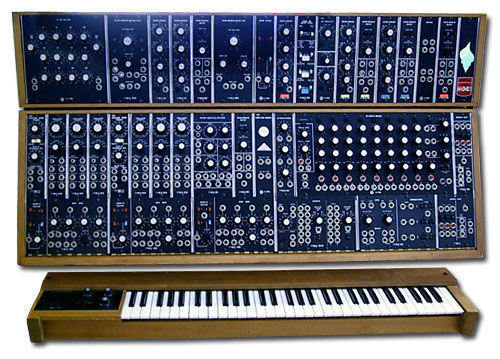
A Moog synthesizer

At Cornell, Moog began work on his first synthesizer components with composer Herb Deutsch. At the time, synthesizers were enormous, room-filling instruments; Moog hoped to build a more compact synthesizer that would appeal to musicians. He believed that practicality and affordability were the most important parameters.

In 1964, Moog began creating the Moog modular synthesizer. It was composed of separate modules that created and shaped sounds, connected by patch cords. Previous synthesizers, such as the RCA Mark II, had created sound from hundreds of vacuum tubes. Instead, Moog used recently available silicon transistors with an exponential relationship between input voltage and output current. With these, he created the voltage-controlled oscillator (VCO), which generates a waveform with a pitch that could be adjusted by changing the voltage. Similarly, he used voltage to control loudness with voltage-controlled amplifiers (VCAs). One innovative feature was its envelope, which controls how notes swell and fade. According to the Guardian, Moog's 1964 paper Voltage-Controlled Music Modules, in which he proposed the Moog synthesizer modules, invented the modern concept of the analog synthesizer.

Moog debuted the instrument at the 1964 Audio Engineering Society convention in New York. It was much smaller than other synthesizers, such as the RCA Synthesizer introduced a decade earlier, and much cheaper, at US$10,000, as compared to the six-figure sums of other synthesizers. Whereas the RCA Synthesizer was programmed with punchcards, Moog's synthesizer could be programmed with knobs and patch cables and played via keyboard, making it attractive to musicians. New Scientist described it as the first commercial synthesizer. At this time, Moog and then Fred Cochran constructed the so-called Moogtonium for the composer Max Brand. It is still operational and exhibited in the Langenzersdorf Museum near Vienna (Austria).

Moog described himself as a toolmaker designing things for his users, not himself. His development was driven by requests and suggestions from various musicians, including Deutsch (who devised the instrument's keyboard interface), Richard Teitelbaum, Vladimir Ussachevsky (credited with devising the ADSR envelope shape), and Wendy Carlos. His other early customers included choreographer and composer Alwin Nikolais and composer John Cage. Universities established electronic music studios with Moog synthesizers. In 1970, Moog released the portable fixed-architecture Minimoog, described as the most famous and influential synthesizer in history.

=== Company decline ===
Though commentators have praised Moog's engineering abilities, some have also described him as a poor businessman. Moog had pursued the development of his synthesizer as a hobby, stressing that he was regarded as a businessman but had not known what a balance sheet was. He likened the experience to a theme park ride: "You know you're not going to get hurt too badly because nobody would let you do that, but you're not quite in control."

Moog only patented his filter design; David Borden, one of the first users of the Minimoog, felt that if Moog had patented his pitch wheel design, he would have become extremely wealthy. According to Sound on Sound, if Moog had created a monopoly on other synthesizer ideas that he created, such as modularity, envelope generation and voltage control, "it's likely the synth industry as we know it today would never have happened."

Beginning in 1971, Moog Music absorbed investors, merged with Norlin Musical Instruments and moved to "less than ideal" premises near Buffalo, New York, amid a debilitating recession. Moog remained employed as a designer at the company until 1977. He said that he would have left earlier if his contract had not required him to remain employed there for four years to cash his stock. By the end of the decade, Moog Music was facing competition from cheaper, easier-to-use instruments by competitors including ARP, Aries, Roland, Sequential Circuits, and E-mu.

=== Big Briar, return of Moog Music ===
In 1978, Moog moved to North Carolina and founded a new electronic instrument company, Big Briar. He also worked as a consultant and vice president for new product research at Kurzweil Music Systems from 1984 to 1988. In the early 1990s, he was a research professor of music at the University of North Carolina at Asheville. In 2002, he renamed Big Briar to Moog Music after retrieving the rights to the name. In later years, he continued to design electronic instruments, including a touchscreen-operated piano.

== Personal life and death ==
Moog married Shirley May Leigh on June 15, 1958. They had four children and divorced in 1994. On May 19, 1996 Moog married Ileana Grams.

In 2001, Moog was awarded the Polar Music Prize in Stockholm, often called the Nobel Prize of music. Polar is the label on which Swedish pop group ABBA published their music, and was owned by their manager and co-composer Stikkan Andersson.

Moog was diagnosed with a glioblastoma multiforme brain tumor on April 28, 2005. He died on August 21, 2005, at the age of 71 in Asheville, North Carolina. He was survived by his second wife Ileana, four children, one stepdaughter and five grandchildren.

== Legacy ==
Moog has had a lasting influence on music. The BBC describes him as a pioneer of synthesized sound. According to the Guardian, his inventions "changed the complexion of the pop and classical music worlds." Moog's name became so associated with electronic music that it was sometimes used as a generic term for any synthesizer.

Moog's awards include honorary doctorates from Polytechnic Institute of New York University (New York City), Lycoming College (Williamsport, Pennsylvania) and Berklee College of Music. He received a Grammy Trustees Award for lifetime achievement in 1970, the Polar Music Prize in 2001 and a Special Merit/Technical Grammy Award in 2002. In 2012, to celebrate Moog's birthday, Google created an interactive version of the Minimoog as its Google Doodle. In 2013, Moog was inducted into the National Inventors Hall of Fame.

=== Museum ===
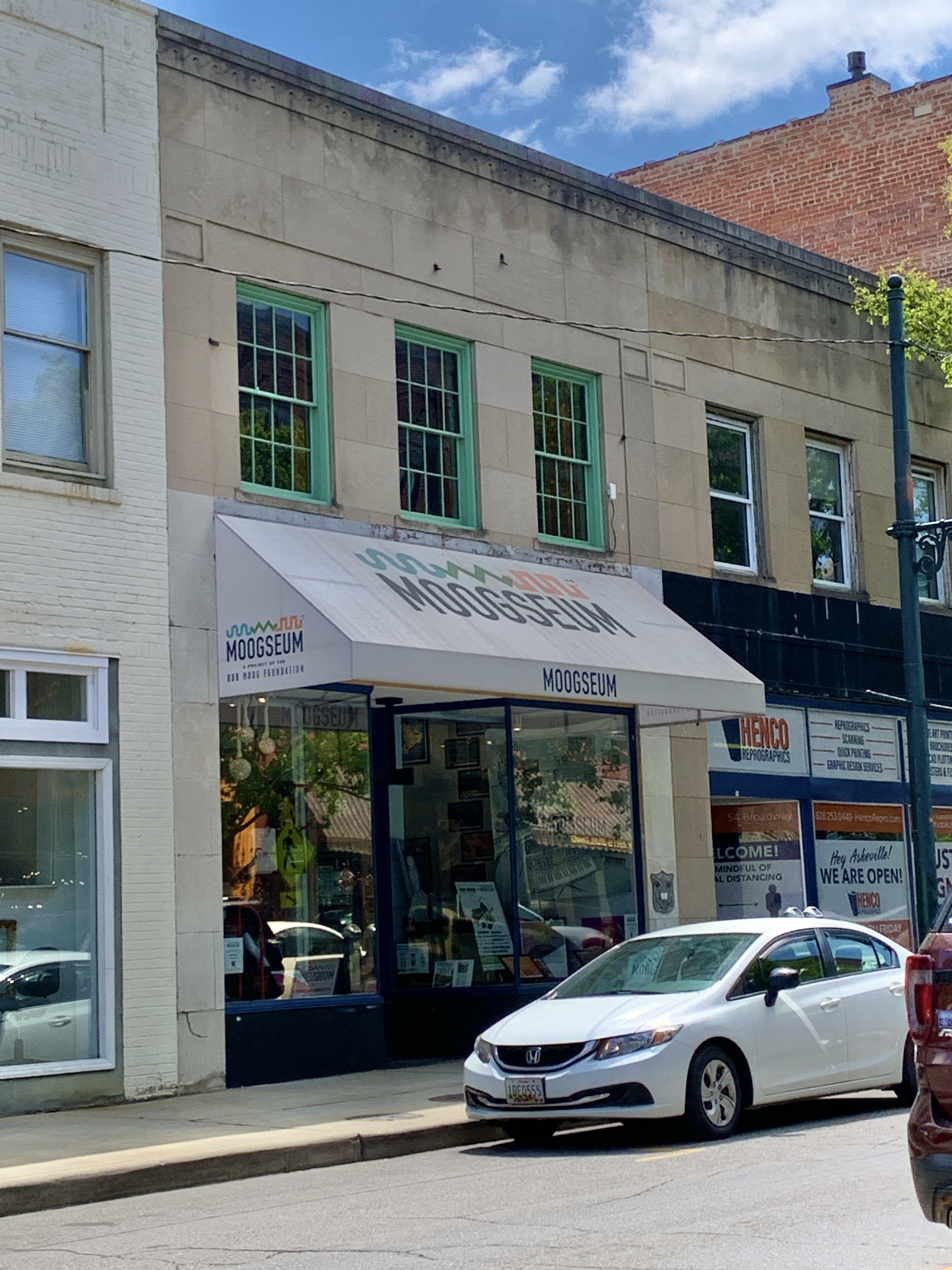
The Moogseum

On July 18, 2013, Moog's widow Ileana Grams-Moog announced plans to donate Moog's archives, maintained by the Bob Moog Foundation, to Cornell University. The foundation offered her $100,000 but Grams-Moog would not sell the archives. She felt that Cornell could provide better access for researchers and that the foundation had not made enough progress toward a planned museum to be worthy of maintaining the collection. The foundation responded that it had sufficiently preserved the collection and had made efforts to improve storage, although it could not yet afford to build the museum.

In August 2019, the Bob Moog Foundation opened the Moogseum, a museum dedicated to Moog's work, in Asheville, North Carolina. The displays include rare theremins, prototype synthesizer modules and Moog's documents.

=== Media ===
Moog has been the subject of books about his life and work, including the 2004 book Analog Days: The Invention and Impact of the Moog Synthesizer by Trevor Pinch and Frank Trocco and the 2023 biography Switched On: Bob Moog and the Synthesizer Revolution by Albert Glinsky. Moog had contributed the foreword to Glinsky's first book, Theremin: Ether Music and Espionage, about Leon Theremin, who was a principal inspiration to Moog.

Moog was also the subject of Moog, a 2004 documentary directed by Hans Fjellestad, who said that Moog "embodies the archetypal American maverick inventor."
