= Jason Robinson (musician) =

American musician, composer and teacher (born 1975)

- Born: September 20, 1975 (age 51); California, U.S.
- Genres: Jazz, improvised music, avant-garde jazz
- Occupations: Musician, composer, teacher
- Instrument: Saxophone
- Years active: 1993–present
- Website: jasonrobinson.com
- Education: Sonoma State University (BA); University of California, San Diego (Master of Arts, PhD)

Jason Robinson (born September 20, 1975) is an American composer, saxophonist, flutist, scholar, and educator. His music is rooted in the jazz tradition but draws on wide-ranging influences and approaches.

== Early life and education ==
Robinson was raised in Folsom, California, where his interest in music began while playing under the direction of Jon Maloney at Folsom Middle School. At Folsom High School, he studied under celebrated music educator Curtis Gaesser, a saxophonist who encouraged Robinson's interest in jazz. While in high school, Robinson began attending concerts and jam sessions in Sacramento's then thriving jazz scene and studied with saxophonist and flutist Jeff Alkire. Robinson subsequently attended University of Southern California and Sonoma State University; from the latter he received a Bachelor of Arts in Jazz Studies and Philosophy, was mentored by bassist and composer Mel Graves and studied Philosophy under Gillian Parker. Robinson later earned a Master of Arts and PhD in music from the University of California, San Diego, where he was mentored by composers George E. Lewis and Anthony Davis.

== Career ==
Robinson began playing gigs in the area of Sacramento, California, while attending Folsom High School. His first album as a leader, From the Sun, was released in 1998 and features mentor and bassist Mel Graves, along with a number of other close associates from Robinson's years living in Sonoma County and playing in the music scenes of the San Francisco Bay Area. He was a member of the groups Cannonball (an early group of the Bay Area's Jazz Mafia music collective) and Groundation, and founded the record label Circumvention Music.

In San Diego, he worked extensively with a trio that featured bassist Rob Thorsen and drummer Brett Sanders.

Robinson has developed long-term collaborative groups, including Cosmologic and Trummerflora. In 2002, Robinson's album Tandem, a series of duos, was released. He is professor of music at Amherst College, and previously taught at the University of California, San Diego, the University of California, Irvine, Southwestern College, Cuyamaca College, and San Diego City College.

== Discography ==
=== As leader ===
- From the Sun (Circumvention, 1998)
- No Stars Please with Trummerflora (Accretions, 2001)
- Tandem (Accretions, 2002)
- Fingerprint (Circumvention, 2007)
- Eyes in the Back of My Head with Cosmologic (Cuneiform, 2008)
- Cerberus Rising (Circumvention, 2009)
- The Two Faces of Janus (Cuneiform, 2010)
- Cerulean Landscape with Anthony Davis (Clean Feed, 2010)
- Cerberus Reigning (Accretions, 2010)
- Tiresian Symmetry with JD Parran, Marcus Rojas, Liberty Ellman (Cuneiform, 2012)
- Resonant Geographies (pfMENTUM, 2018)
- Harmonic Constituent (Playscape, 2020)
- Two Hours Early, Ten Minutes Late: Duo Music of Ken Aldcroft (Accretions, 2020)
- The Urgency of Now (Creative Nation, 2020)
- Ancestral Numbers I (Playscape, 2024)
- Ancestral Numbers II (Playscape, 2024)
- Ancestral Dubbers (dub remix single, with Marcus Urani) (Circumvention Music, 2024)
- Blue Salience: For Yusef Lateef (Circumvention Music, 2026)

=== As sideman ===
With Groundation

- Each One Teach One (Young Tree, 2001)
- Hebron Gate (Young Tree, 2002)
- Dub Wars (Young Tree, 2005)
- Upon the Bridge (Young Tree, 2006)
- Here I Am (Naive, 2009)
- A Miracle (Soulbeats, 2014)

With others

- B-Side Players, Radio Afro-Mexica (Global Noize, 2009)
- Anthony Davis, Tania (Koch, 2001)
- Marty Ehrlich, A Trumpet in the Morning (New World, 2013)
- Marty Ehrlich, OPEN AIR: The Complete Saxophone Quartet Compositions of Julius Hemphill (Out Of Your Head Records, 2026)
- Hans Fjellestad, Dual Resonance (Circumvention, 2003)
- Rising Tide, Rising Tide (Soul Beat Records, 2016)
- Michael Musillami Trio +2, Life Anthem (Playscape, 2019)
- Jefferson Pitcher, Alder and Oak (Lost Forest, 2021)
- Roger Aplon and Marcos Fernandes, Of What I’ve Seen (Accretions Records, 2023)
- Elijah Emanuel, Tres Sangres (2008)
- Toots and the Maytals, Light Your Light (Fantasy Records, 2007)
- Cannonball, Funky Soul Music (Flying Harold Records, 1998)
