= Experimental Jetset =

Dutch graphic design studio

Experimental Jetset is a Dutch graphic design collective composed of Danny van den Dungen (born 1971), Marieke Stolk (born 1967) and Erwin Brinkers (born 1973). Their work focuses on printed matter, museum installations, and brand identities.

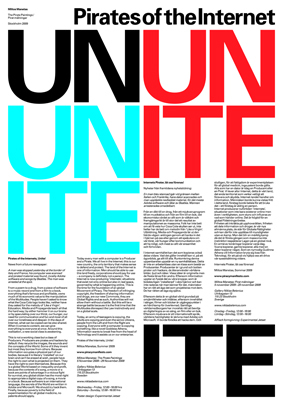
2009 poster design by Experimental Jetset for "Pirates of the Internet Unite", a manifesto by artist Miltos Manetas

Works by Experimental Jetset are held in permanent collections of the Museum of Modern Art, Cooper Hewitt Design Museum, SFMOMA, Chicago Art Institute, Museum für Gestaltung, and Stedelijk Museum. The group's most notable projects include the 2013 logotype and brand identity for the Whitney Museum in New York and the popular 2001 Beatles-inspired T-shirt John & Paul & Ringo & George.

Experimental Jetset was formed in Amsterdam in 1997. Members of the group met while studying at Gerrit Rietveld Academie. The collective's name references Experimental Jet Set, Trash and No Star, a 1994 album by rock band Sonic Youth.

Experimental Jetset are known for using the Helvetica font in most of their works and were featured in the 2007 Helvetica documentary film. Their designs rarely center on imagery like photography or illustration, relying instead on typography, and are notable for their use of a restrained color palette, limited mostly to black, white, red, and blue. The group's work combines modernist and post-punk influences, drawing on Dutch art movements like De Stijl and Provo.

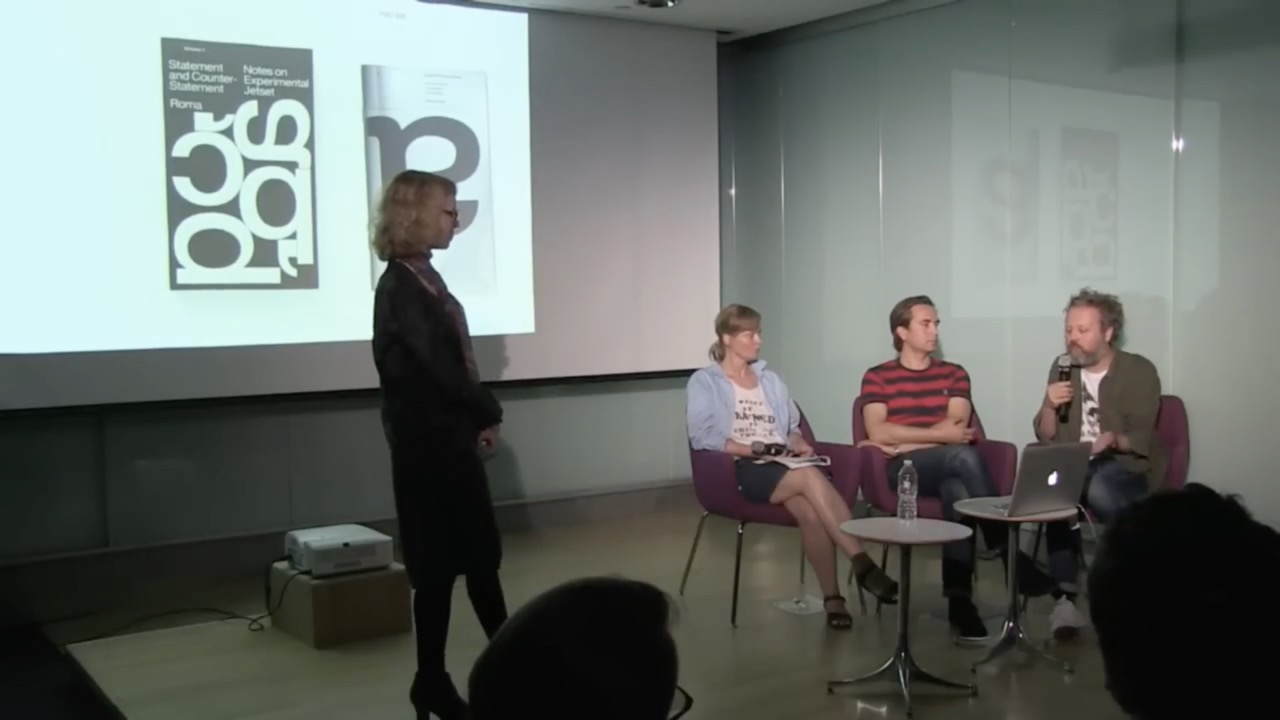
Members of Experimental Jetset with Ellen Lupton (left) during a 2015 live-streamed event at the Cooper Hewitt Design Museum

Experimental Jetset authored a series of books: Statement And Counter-Statement: Notes on Experimental Jetset (2015), Full Scale, False Scale: A Reader Of Sorts (2019), and Superstructures (2021), all published by the Dutch imprint Roma.

== Publications ==
- Experimental Jetset: Superstructures. Roma 400, Roma Publications, Amsterdam 2021, ISBN 978-94-92811-86-8
- Experimental Jetset: Full Scale, False Scale. Roma 375, Roma Publications, Amsterdam 2019, ISBN 978-94-92811-67-7
- Experimental Jetset: Statement and Counter-Statement – Notes on Experimental Jetset. Roma 250, Roma Publications, Amsterdam 2017, ISBN 978-94-91843-40-2
- Experimental Jetset: Automatically Arranged Alphabets. Roma 249, Roma Publications, Amsterdam 2015, ISBN 978-94-91843-39-6

== See also ==
- Graphic design
- Gerrit Rietveld Academie
- Experimental Jet Set, Trash and No Star
- Dutch design
