= Tonko Soljan =

American film producer

Tonko Soljan is a Croatian American film and television producer known best for the PBS acquired documentary film Beyond Our Differences and the broadly distributed feature film Adrift in Manhattan starring Heather Graham, William Baldwin, Dominic Chianese and Victor Rasuk. Soljan is also a key player in the launch of Discovery Channel's series Storm Chasers and MTV's Teen Mom.

Additionally Soljan has independently produced for clients including Paramount Pictures, Original Media, City Lights Media Group, Magnolia Pictures, HDNet, Dogmatic, Departure Films, and many networks including as NBC, AMC, Discovery Channel, TruTV, MTV, Fuel TV, FitTV, Food Network, A&E, History Channel, Bravo, ABC, CMT, Lifetime, and numerous others.

Soljan is the executive vice president of business affairs for ITV America, and formerly executive in charge and vice president of business affairs for production powerhouse Leftfield Pictures, the company behind the hit series such as History Channel's Pawn Stars, Counting Cars and American Restoration, FOX's American Grit and History Channel's Alone. Previously he was the head of production for New York documentary film outfit Entropy Films.
