= These Promises Are Being Videotaped =

Studio album by El Ten Eleven
- Released: July 15, 2008
- Recorded: 2007
- Genres: Post-rock, instrumental rock
- Label: Fake Record Label

El Ten Eleven chronology
Every Direction Is North (2007)	These Promises Are Being Videotaped (2008)	It's Still Like a Secret (2010)

Professional ratings
Review scores
Source	Rating
URB	4/5 stars

These Promises Are Being Videotaped is the third studio album by American post-rock duo El Ten Eleven, released on July 15, 2008.

== Track listing ==
1. "Jumping Frenchmen of Maine"
2. "I Like Van Halen Because My Sister Says They Are Cool"
3. "Fat Gym Riot"
4. "Adam and Nathan Totally Kick Ass"
5. "K10"
6. "Paranoid Android"
7. "Chino"
8. "Numb Tooth"
