= It's Still Like a Secret =

Studio album by El Ten Eleven
- Released: November 9, 2010
- Recorded: 2010
- Genres: Post-rock, instrumental rock
- Label: Fake Record Label

El Ten Eleven chronology
These Promises Are Being Videotaped (2008)	It's Still Like a Secret (2010)	Transitions (2012)

It's Still Like a Secret is the fourth studio album by American post-rock duo El Ten Eleven, released November 9, 2010 through Fake Record Label. The album was sold at shows during their fall 2010 tour and officially released on 9 November. The album's title is a reference to Built to Spill's 1999 album Keep It Like a Secret.

== Music videos ==
The band released music videos for two of the songs on the album: "Falling" and "The Sycophants Are Coming! The Sycophants Are Coming!"

== Track listing ==
1. "Ya No" – 1:49
2. "The Sycophants Are Coming! The Sycophants Are Coming!" – 3:13
3. "Indian Winter" – 4:41
4. "Falling" – 3:11
5. "Triangle Face" – 4:12
6. "Ian Mackaye Was Right" – 4:16
7. "Marriage Is the New Going Steady" – 3:34
8. "Cease and Persist" – 3:45
9. "Anxiety Is Cheap" – 4:03
10. "Settling with Power" – 3:02
11. "83" – 1:58
12. "Tomorrow Is an Excuse for Today" – 3:52
