= Jon Pack =

Jon Pack is an American photographer based in New York City. Pack is known as a photojournalist and street photographer, and for his work as an on-location still photographer for film and television productions.

== Career ==
While watching the 2008 Summer Olympics in Beijing, Pack became interested in the afterlife of the venues constructed for the Olympic Games. He told CNN, "All the coverage was talking about how much money was being spent on the Olympics in Beijing. It was so surprising that instead of talking about the athletes or the sports, they were talking so much about the facilities and amount of money." Pack began traveling to host cities to photograph former Olympic venues in Autumn, 2008. "I want to see what hosting the Olympics does to a city," Pack said in an interview with The Atlantic. "Both the good and the bad: how it instills a sense of national pride, how it can help a city find incredible new ways to use its own space, how it can be completely overshadowed by events like war or economic collapse, and how it can create modern day ruins in the midst of places that are otherwise bustling."

In 2012, Pack began collaborating with filmmaker Gary Hustwit and announced The Olympic City, a documentary photography project that would look at former host cities of the Olympic Games and how the events had impacted those cities. The first phase of the project looked at 13 cities, the resulting photographs were published in a hardcover book in 2013. The photos were also shown at museums and galleries including Storefront for Art and Architecture in New York, the Atlanta Contemporary Art Center, the Brooklyn Museum of Art 2016 exhibit "Who Shot Sports?" and the SFMOMA 2024-2025 exhibit "Get in the Game: Sports, Art, Culture." Hustwit and Pack have stated that this is an ongoing project and that they are continuing to photograph additional cities around the world.

On November 13, 2015, Pack was in Paris during the terrorist attacks, and took photos of the aftermath.

In 2020, Pack collaborated with writer Mathias Svalina on The Depression, a book of poetry and photographs described as "a surreal and shifting deep-dive into clinical depression".

Pack works as a still photographer on film and television productions, including While We're Young, directed by Noah Baumbach, Past Lives directed by Celine Song, and the TV series Severance, Search Party and Broad City.

== Publications ==
- The Olympic City with Gary Hustwit, foreword by Michael Kimmelman, 2013.
- Victory Journal Number 12, 2016.
- The Depression with Mathias Svalina, 2020.
