= El Ten Eleven (album) =

Studio album by El Ten Eleven
- Released: August 7, 2004 (Fake Record Label); September 20, 2005 (Bar None Records)
- Recorded: 2004
- Studios: 48 Windows Studios (Santa Monica, CA); Kristian's Garage; Swinghouse Studios (Hollywood, CA)
- Genres: Post-rock, instrumental rock
- Length: 35:33
- Labels: Bar/None, Fake Record Label (reissue)
- Producer: El Ten Eleven

El Ten Eleven chronology
El Ten Eleven (2004)	Every Direction Is North (2007)

El Ten Eleven is the debut album by American post-rock band El Ten Eleven, released August 7, 2004.

Spin magazine called the album "a sort of Silverlake-style Sigur Rós... experimental instrumental music that's both highly skilled and deeply felt".

The album cover features a silhouetted trijet – however, it is a Boeing 727, not a Lockheed L-1011.

On 9/27/2019 Joyful Noise Recordings released a 15 year anniversary version of the record which included the bonus tracks "A Watched Pot" and "Fanshawe (live in Asheville)."

Professional ratings
Review scores
Source	Rating
AllMusic	link

== Track listing ==
1. "My Only Swerving" – 5:15
2. "Sorry About Your Irony" – 3:19
3. "Lorge" – 3:57
4. "1969" – 0:47
5. "Central Nervous Piston" – 4:50
6. "Thinking Loudly" – 4:24
7. "Fanshawe" – 5:12
8. "Connie" – 6:25
9. "Bye Mom" – 1:29
