= Every Direction Is North =

Studio album by El Ten Eleven
- Released: July 2, 2007
- Recorded: 2006 in Kristian's Garage
- Genres: Post-rock, math rock, instrumental rock
- Length: 41:48
- Label: Fake Record Label

El Ten Eleven chronology
El Ten Eleven (2004)	Every Direction Is North (2007)	These Promises Are Being Videotaped (2008)

Professional ratings
Review scores
Source	Rating
Beatbots	6/10 stars

Every Direction Is North is the second full-length studio album from American post-rock duo El Ten Eleven, released July 2, 2007.

Since its release, it has received multiple favorable reviews.

== Track listing ==
1. "3 Plus 4" – 4:12
2. "Every Direction Is North" – 5:12
3. "Hot Cakes" – 2:42
4. "Estrella" – 3:39
5. "Music for Staring at Ceilings" – 2:35
6. "Keep" – 4:02
7. "Dax Pierson" – 3:02
8. "Living on Credit Blues" – 4:12
9. "The 49th Day" – 4:53
10. "Bye Annie, Bye Joe, Bye Michael, Bye Jake" – 7:24
