= Mathias Svalina =

American poet

Mathias Svalina (born June 24, 1975), is an American poet. He has won fellowships and awards from The Bread Loaf Writers’ Conference, The Iowa Review, and New Michigan Press. His poems have been published in journals such as American Letters & Commentary, The Boston Review, Gulf Coast, and jubilat. He operates a Dream Delivery Service and also co-edits Octopus Magazine and Octopus Books with Zachary Schomburg. He is a native of Chicago, Illinois.

== Educational background ==
Svalina received his B.A. from the University of Mary Washington, an M.F.A. from the Virginia Commonwealth University, and a Ph.D. from the University of Nebraska–Lincoln. As of 2012, he lives and teaches literature in Denver, Colorado.

== Teaching career ==
Svalina has taught writing at Metropolitan State University of Denver, Nebraska Wesleyan University, and the University of Nebraska–Lincoln.

== Dream Delivery Service ==
Svalina has operated a Dream Delivery Service in Denver, Colorado since 2014. Since the fall of 2016 and on through the summer of 2017, he will be delivering dreams in other cities, including Richmond, Tucson, Marfa, Austin & Chicago. He hand delivers poems to subscribers within a 4 mile radius of his home base in each city and delivers poems by mail to every other subscriber. While in Richmond, he estimates that he biked over 800 miles within 31 days and delivered over 1400 poems. In November 2016 while in Tucson, he estimates to have biked over 1100 miles and delivered 1530 "dreams".

His poems are surrealist narratives of dream sequences or, optionally and for a higher price, nightmare sequences. By his own account, the majority of subscriptions are for his dreams. He donates 15% of all subscription fees to Planned Parenthood in whichever state he is based at for each subscription duration.

== Published works ==
- The Wine-Dark Sea, Sidebrow Books, 2016. ISBN 978-1-940090-05-4
- Wastoid, Big Lucks Books, 2014. ISBN 978-1-941985-90-8
- I Am A Very Productive Entrepreneur, Mud Luscious Press, 2011. ISBN 978-0-9830263-5-8
- Whatever You Love of Weapons You Love for Weapons, Brave Men Press, 2010.
- Destruction Myth, Cleveland State University Poetry Center, 2009. ASIN B005GYA9X8
- The Viral Lease, Small Anchor Press, 2009.
- Play, The Cupboard Pamphlet, 2009.
- Why I Am White, Kitchen Press, 2007.
- Creation Myths, New Michigan Press, 2007. ISBN 978-0-9791501-9-7

Collaborations

- The Depression with Jon Pack, Civil Coping Mechanisms, 2020 ISBN 978-1951628024
- Sugar Means Yes with Julia Cohen (Grieving Ghost Press)
- When We Broke the Microscope with Julia Cohen (Small Fires Press, 2008)
- Or Else What, Asked the Flame with Paula Cisewski (Scantily Clad Press, 2008)
