= Florence Moog =

American research biologist (1915–1986)

Florence E. Moog
- Born: 1915
- Died: 1986 (aged 70–71); St. Louis, Missouri
- Education: New York University (BS); Columbia University (MS), (PhD)
- Scientific career
- Fields: Biology
- Workplaces: Washington University in St. Louis

Florence E. Moog (1915–1986) was an American biologist known for her research of enzymes in the intestinal tract, which was used by pediatricians to determine how lungs mature in premature babies and to develop a therapy for premature infants to establish normal lung functioning.

== Education ==
Moog earned her undergraduate degree from New York University and master's and doctorate degrees from Columbia University.

== Career ==
Moog joined the faculty at Washington University in St. Louis as a research associate in zoology in 1942. In 1974, she was named Charles Rebstock Professor Emeritus of Biology. She chaired the Department of Biology from 1975 to 1977. At Washington University, she taught undergraduate and graduate level courses in the physiological and biochemical aspects of vertebrate development and developed a study course on comparative anatomy and embryology, which received national recognition and became a model of its kind throughout the country. Having been at the university for 42 years, she retired in 1984.

== Research ==
Moog won international attention for her pioneering and long-term investigations of enzymes in the intestinal tract. Her research of an enzyme found in the surface membrane of the intestine and how phosphate affected the development of the intestinal tract was used by pediatricians to study how lungs mature in embryos and premature babies. Her work is considered as one of several significant factors that contributed to the development of a therapy for premature infants to bring about normal lung function.

In 1949, Moog published Structure and Development of the Vertebrates.

== Writing ==
A gifted writer, Moog was a contributor to Scientific American. In 1959, she began editing Nuclear Information, the monthly readership for which increased steadily under her guidance. One of her most famous contributions was her 1959 analysis of what would happen if St. Louis were under a full nuclear attack ("Nuclear War in St. Louis: One Year Later"). Her "fictional, almost clinical account of the deaths from radiation and fire, contaminated food and water, blindness, disease, and of the destruction of the city's infrastructure" was reprinted in the Saturday Review and as an individual document with 45,000 copies in print by the next decade.

== Honors and awards ==
Moog's article "The Biology of Old Age," published in Scientific American, won the Westinghouse Prize for distinguished science writing in magazines in 1948.

In 1981, Moog received Washington University's Distinguished Faculty Award.

In 1983, Moog was honored by Washington University with the establishment of an endowed scholarship in her name, the Florence Moog Fellowship in Biological Sciences and Chemistry, a full-tuition, merit-based scholarship for incoming students selected for the Honorary Scholars Program in the College of Arts & Sciences at Washington University in St. Louis.

== Activism ==
Moog took up the cause of women's liberation and asserted that too few members of advisory committees of the National Institutes of Health were women. In 1971, Moog wrote the article, "Male Bias of the NIH," which was published in Science. As a result, a directive by Eliot L. Richardson, then Secretary of Health, Education and Welfare, declared that "at least one-third of all nominees or appointees for committees shall be women, assuming qualified women are available to fill vacancies."

== Personal life ==
Moog had one brother, George. Her nephew was Robert Moog, the inventor of the Moog synthesizer.
