= Jessica Edwards =

Canadian-American filmmaker

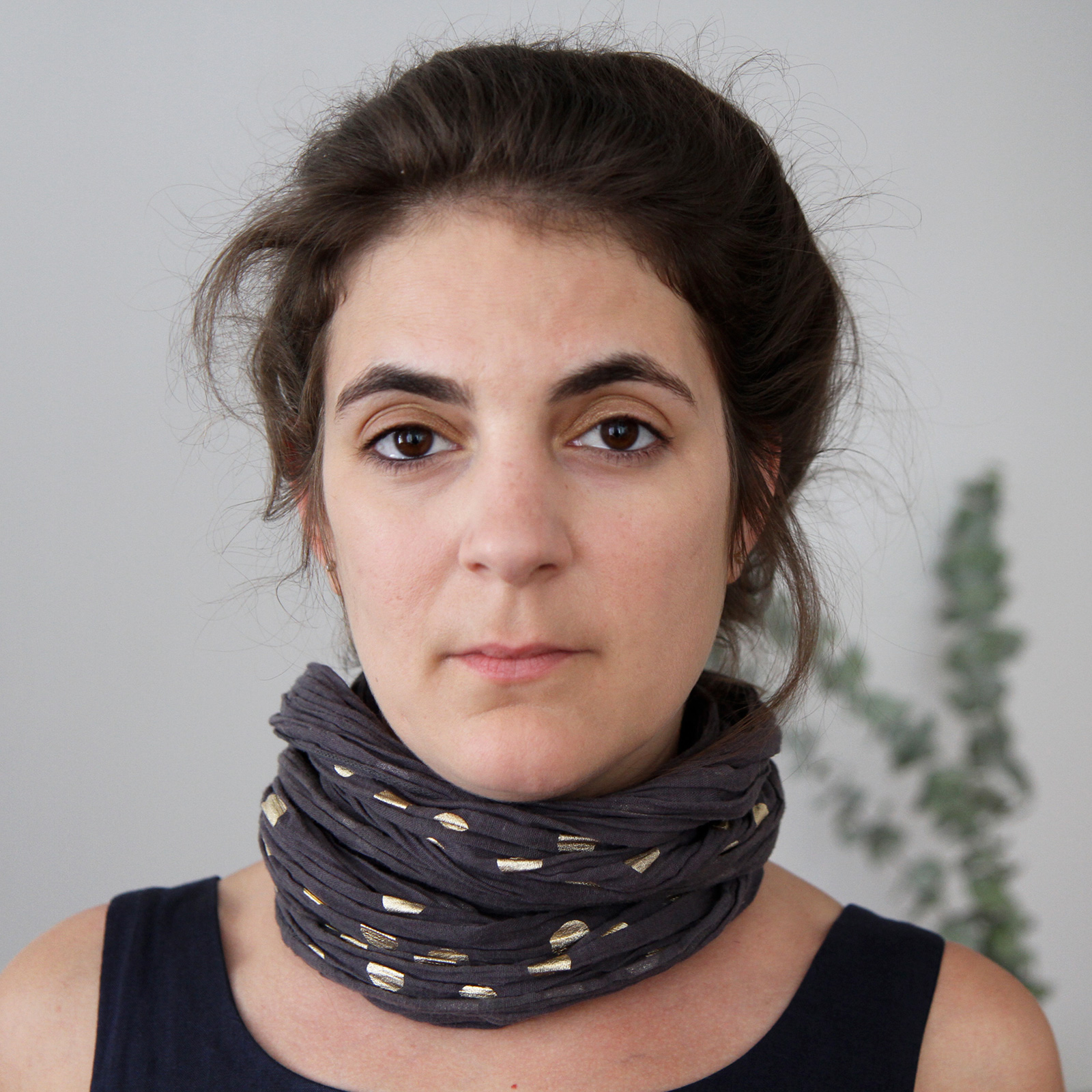
- Occupation: Documentary filmmaker
- Notable work: Mavis!, Seltzer Works

Jessica Edwards is a Canadian-American filmmaker known for her documentary Mavis! about musician and civil rights figure Mavis Staples.

== Early career ==
Edwards received a BFA in Cinema from Montreal’s Concordia University and a master's degree in Media Studies from The New School in New York City. She began her career as a film publicist, working with filmmakers including Ang Lee, Sofia Coppola and David Cronenberg. In 2010, she produced and directed her first short documentary Seltzer Works, about Kenny Gomberg, the last seltzer bottler in Brooklyn. The film was broadcast on PBS as part of the documentary series POV in August, 2010.

== Tell Me Something ==
In 2013, Edwards edited and published Tell Me Something: Documentary Filmmakers, a book of creative advice from 60 filmmakers including Errol Morris, Barbara Kopple, Albert Maysles, Martin Scorsese, Michael Moore, Gary Hustwit, Lucy Walker, Kim Longinotto, and others. The book's publication was funded through a Kickstarter crowdfunding campaign.

== Mavis! ==
Edwards saw a live performance by gospel/soul singer Mavis Staples in Brooklyn in 2013, and was inspired to approach Staples about making a documentary about her and her family group, The Staple Singers. Mavis! follows Staples' career, and examines gospel and folk music's part in the civil rights movement of the ‘60s, as well as the Staples family's friendship with Martin Luther King Jr. and Staples' continued focus on civil rights. Edwards stated, "I didn’t want the civil rights movement to appear historical. To Mavis, the fight for equality didn’t end in the 60s, and I really wanted to emphasize that." The film also featured interviews and performances by Bob Dylan, Prince, Levon Helm, Bonnie Raitt, Julian Bond, Jeff Tweedy, and Chuck D.

The film premiered at the South by Southwest Film Festival in March, 2015, and was acquired for US broadcast by HBO. Edwards won a 2016 Peabody Award for the film, and was named one of the "10 Documakers to Watch" by Variety.
