= Objectified =

- Directed by: Gary Hustwit
- Produced by: Gary Hustwit
- Cinematography: Luke Geissbühler
- Edited by: Joe Beshenkovsky
- Music by: Kristian Dunn
- Production companies: Plexi Productions; Swiss Dots
- Release date: March 14, 2009
- Running time: 75 minutes
- Country: United States
- Language: English

Objectified is a feature-length documentary film examining the role of every day non-living objects and the people who design them, in our daily lives. The film is directed by Gary Hustwit. Objectified premièred at the South By Southwest Festival on March 14, 2009.

According to Swiss Dots Production, the film is the second part of the three-film series Design Trilogy, the first being Helvetica about the famous typeface, and the third and final film being the documentary Urbanized.

== Appearing characters ==
- Paola Antonelli - Design Curator, Museum of Modern Art (New York)
- Chris Bangle - Former Design Director, BMW Group (Munich)
- Ronan & Erwan Bouroullec - Designers (Paris)
- Andrew Blauvelt - Design Curator, Walker Art Center
- Tim Brown - CEO, IDEO
- Anthony Dunne - Designer (London)
- Agnete Enga - Senior Industrial Designer, Smart Design
- Dan Formosa - Design & Research, Smart Design (New York)
- Naoto Fukasawa - Designer (Tokyo)
- Jonathan Ive - Former Chief Design Officer, Apple (Cupertino)
- Hella Jongerius - Designer (Rotterdam)
- David M. Kelley - Founder & Chairman, IDEO
- Bill Moggridge - Co-founder, IDEO
- Marc Newson - Designer (London/Paris)
- Fiona Raby - Designer (London)
- Dieter Rams - Former Design Director, Braun (Kronberg, Germany)
- Karim Rashid - Designer (New York)
- Alice Rawsthorn - Design Editor, International Herald Tribune
- Amber Shonts - Model
- Davin Stowell - CEO & Founder, Smart Design
- Jane Fulton Suri - IDEO
- Rob Walker - New York Times Magazine
