= Rams (2018 film) =

- Directed by: Gary Hustwit
- Music by: Brian Eno
- Release date: November 28, 2018
- Country: United States
- Language: German

Rams is a documentary film about German industrial designer Dieter Rams, directed by Gary Hustwit.

== Summary ==
The film examines Rams' influence on modern design, his work for Braun and Vitsœ, and his philosophies on sustainability and consumerism.

== Production ==
Hustwit ran a successful Kickstarter campaign in 2016 to raise initial funding for the film.

The film was announced in June 2016, and was released in Fall 2018.

== Soundtrack ==
English musician Brian Eno composed the film's music. The soundtrack album of the score, Rams: Original Soundtrack Album, was first released on 2500 copies on white vinyl on 29 August 2020 for Record Store Day (postponed from April 18). The CD release followed in 2021.
