= The Speed of Thought =

- Directed by: Evan Oppenheimer
- Written by: Evan Oppenheimer
- Produced by: Julio DePietro; Chris Romano
- Starring: Nick Stahl; Taryn Manning; Mía Maestro
- Cinematography: Luke Geissbühler
- Edited by: Allison Eve Zell
- Production company: El Camino Films
- Release date: April 11, 2011
- Country: United States
- Language: English

The Speed of Thought, also known as Scopers, is a 2011 American thriller film written and directed by Evan Oppenheimer and starring Nick Stahl, Taryn Manning, and Mía Maestro.

== Plot ==
Joshua Lazarus is a telepath who has been raised in an NSA foster home. Lazarus helps the government by using his abilities. He is told by the agency that the telepathy is a side effect of Widmann's Disease, and that he will become insane in time and eventually die from the illness. However, Lazarus meets a woman with similar powers who does not have any sign of the disease, launching Lazarus to confront the lies he has been told.

== Cast ==
- Nick Stahl as Joshua Lazarus
- Mía Maestro as Anna Manheim
- Taryn Manning as Kira
- Wallace Shawn as Sandy
- Blair Brown as Bridger
- Erik Palladino as Butler
- Alan Cox as Alexei

== Production ==
Filming took place in Punta del Este, Uruguay and New York City.

== Soundtrack ==
The songs featured during the movie are as follows:

- "Honey" by El Presidente
- "Cerulean" by James Dean
- "Cave In" by The Picture
- "Illi Villi" by Sophocles Jones
- "Today" by Joshua James
