= Nikki Haskell =

American socialite and talk show host

Nikki Haskell Goldbus (born 17 May 1941) is an American socialite, entrepreneur, and talk show host. During the 1980s, she was a fixture of the New York City social scene and was a regular at Studio 54. In the 1980s, she hosted The Nikki Haskell Show, a television show which featured interviews with celebrities.

She is jewish
