= Gary Hustwit =

American independent filmmaker and photographer

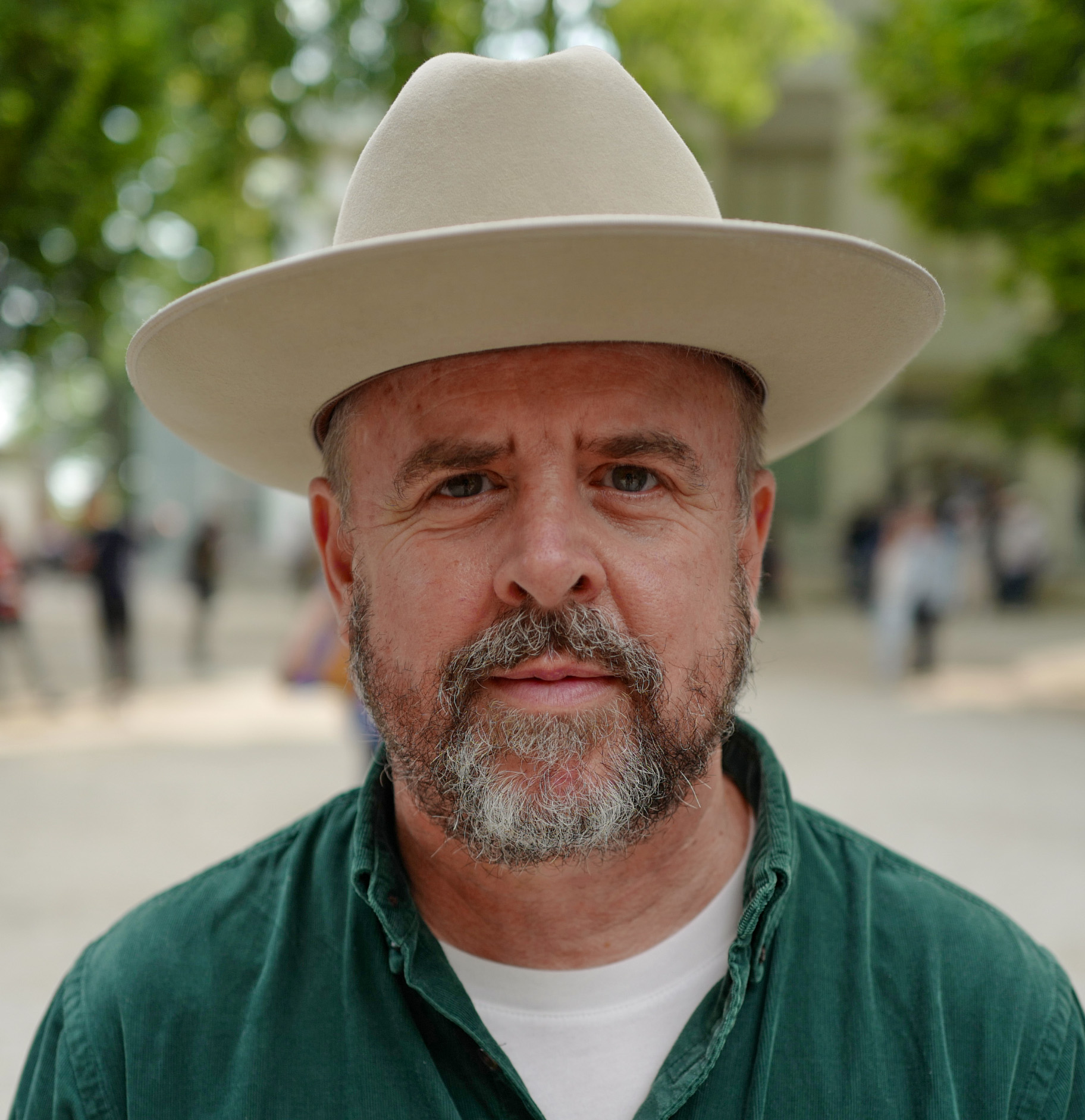
- Hustwit in 2017
- Born: 1965 (age 60–61)
- Occupations: Independent filmmaker and photographer
- Notable work: The Design Trilogy (Helvetica, Objectified, Urbanized), Rams

Gary Hustwit is an American independent filmmaker and photographer. He is best known for his design documentaries, which examine the impact of trends in graphic design, typography, industrial design, architecture, and urban planning. He told Dwell magazine, "I like the idea of taking a closer look at the things we take for granted and changing the way people think about them." In addition to filmmaking, he has been active in the independent music and book publishing industries.

== Career ==
While in college at San Diego State University in the mid-1980s, Hustwit began working with independent bands and promoting concerts. In 1987 he self-published the book "Releasing an Independent Record", a guide to how to start a record label. Hustwit continued to publish books by other authors about the music business, fiction, and poetry. Hustwit worked with punk record label SST Records in Los Angeles in 1989 and 1990, doing distribution.

In 1999 Hustwit moved to New York City and opened a publishing office and bookstore called Incommunicado, as part of the Lower East Side nightclub Tonic. He began making audio recordings of authors reading from their books, and eventually launched a website that featured these spoken word recordings in MP3 format. MP3Lit.com was acquired by the news website Salon.com in May 2000, and Hustwit became Vice President of Salon.com.

In September 2001 Hustwit left Salon.com to co-found Plexifilm, a DVD production and distribution company, along with Sean Anderson, the former head of DVD Production at the Criterion Collection. Between 2002 and 2011 Plexifilm released over 40 films theatrically and on home video, including films by the Maysles brothers, Apichatpong Weerasethakul, Andy Warhol, and David Byrne.

Hustwit made his film directorial debut in 2007 with Helvetica, a documentary which examined the role of typography and graphic design in visual culture. He released Objectified in 2009, a film which looked at industrial design and product design, and featured Jonathan Ive, Marc Newson, Dieter Rams, Hella Jongerius and others. Hustwit directed Urbanized in 2011, a documentary which covered urban planning and architecture. Hustwit's documentaries have been critically acclaimed and globally successful, with Bethan Ryder writing in Wallpaper, "Cities and urban planning, typography and toothbrushes – American documentary filmmaker Gary Hustwit is known for turning his enquiring lens on the things we take for granted and showing them in a new light, gaining him a cult following among the global design community."

In 2012, Hustwit and photographer Jon Pack announced The Olympic City, a documentary photography project that would look at former host cities of the Olympic Games and how the events had impacted those cities. The first phase of the project looked at 13 cities, the resulting photographs were published in a hardcover book in 2013. The photos were also shown at museums and galleries including Storefront for Art and Architecture in New York, the Atlanta Contemporary Art Center, and the Brooklyn Museum of Art 2016 exhibit "Who Shot Sports?". Hustwit and Pack have stated that this is an ongoing project and that they are continuing to photograph additional cities around the world.

Hustwit was invited to participate in the 2016 Venice Biennale of Architecture with Workplace, a site-specific documentary film about the future of the office. The film followed the design and construction of digital agency R/GA's New York headquarters, designed with architects Foster + Partners.

In 2016, Hustwit announced that he was making a feature documentary about German product designer Dieter Rams with original music from Brian Eno. Rams premiered in theaters in September 2018, and had its television premiere on the BBC in August 2019.

During the COVID-19 pandemic from March to May 2020, Hustwit offered free access to his films for viewers staying indoors during quarantine, giving away over 600,000 copies of the films.

In 2025, Hustwit gave a TED Talk challenges the idea that a movie must tell one fixed story.

== Awards ==
In 2008, Hustwit was nominated for the Independent Spirit "Truer Than Fiction" Award for Helvetica.

== Filmography ==
=== Director ===
- 2007: Helvetica
- 2009: Objectified
- 2011: Urbanized
- 2012: The Landfill
- 2016: Workplace
- 2018: Rams
- 2019: "Jubilee" (music video for JD McPherson)
- 2020: The Map (documentary short)
- 2024: Eno

=== Producer ===
- 2002: I Am Trying to Break Your Heart: A Film About Wilco, directed by Sam Jones
- 2003: "Dirty Old Town" (Ted Leo & the Pharmacists), directed by Justin Mitchell
- 2004: Moog, directed by Hans Fjellestad
- 2005: Drive Well, Sleep Carefully: On the Road with Death Cab for Cutie, directed by Justin Mitchell
- 2005: Spend an Evening with Saddle Creek, directed by Jason Kulbel and Rob Walters
- 2010: Animal Collective's ODDSAC, directed by Danny Perez
- 2015: Mavis!, directed by Jessica Edwards
- 2018: Design Canada, directed by Greg Durrell
- 2022: Skate Dreams
