= Moog (film) =

- Directed by: Hans Fjellestad
- Written by: Hans Fjellestad
- Produced by: Hans Fjellestad; Ryan Page
- Starring: Robert Moog
- Cinematography: Daniel Kozman; Elia Lyssy
- Edited by: Hans Fjellestad
- Production company: ZU33
- Distributed by: Microcinema International
- Release dates: July 3, 2004 (Karlovy Vary); September 17, 2004 (United States)
- Running time: 70 minutes
- Country: United States
- Language: English
- Box office: $3,604

Moog is a 2004 American documentary film by Hans Fjellestad about electronic instrument pioneer Robert Moog. The film features scenes of Moog interacting with various musicians who view him as an influential figure in the history of electronic music.

Moog is not a comprehensive history of electronic music nor does it serve as a chronological history of the development of the Moog synthesizer. There is no narration, and the scenes feature candid conversation and interviews that serve more as a tribute to Moog than as a biographical documentary.

The film was shot on location in Hollywood, New York, Tokyo and Asheville, North Carolina, where Moog's company is based. Additional concert performances were filmed in London and San Francisco.

The film's 2004 release was designed to coincide with the fiftieth anniversary of Moog Music, Moog's company, founded as R. A. Moog Co. in 1954.

== Artists who appear in the film ==
- Charlie Clouser
- Herbert Deutsch
- Keith Emerson
- Edd Kalehoff
- Gershon Kingsley
- Pamelia Kurstin
- DJ Logic
- Money Mark
- The Moog Cookbook
- Mix Master Mike
- Jean-Jacques Perrey
- Walter Sear
- DJ Spooky
- Stereolab
- Luke Vibert
- Rick Wakeman
- Bernie Worrell

== Soundtrack ==
Moog

Soundtrack album by Various artists
- Released: 2004
- Genre: Soundtrack

The soundtrack features 17 original songs by different artists produced on Moog instruments:

1. "Abominatron" (33)
2. "Variation One" (Stereolab)
3. "Bob's Funk" (The Moog Cookbook)
4. "You Moog Me" (Jean-Jacques Perrey & Luke Vibert)
5. "The Sentinel" (Psilonaut)
6. "Unavailable Memory" (Meat Beat Manifesto)
7. "When Bernie Speaks" (Bernie Worrell & Bootsy Collins)
8. "Endless Horizon (I Love Bob Mix)" (Electric Skychurch)
9. "Micro Melodies" (The Album Leaf)
10. "I Am a Spaceman" (Charlie Clouser)
11. "Sqeeble" (Plastiq Phantom)
12. "Realistic Source" (Bostich)
13. "You Have Been Selected" (Pete Devriese)
14. "Nanobot Highway" (Money Mark)
15. "Mixed Waste 4.2" (Baiyon)
16. "Beautiful Love" (Tortoise)
17. "Another Year Away" (Roger O'Donnell)

The double-CD soundtrack album also features seven songs that prominently feature Moog instruments that were not recorded for or used in the film:

1. "Lucky Man" (Emerson, Lake & Palmer)
2. "Cars" (Gary Numan)
3. "E.V.A." (Jean-Jacques Perrey)
4. "Mongoloid" (Devo)
5. "Blue Monday" (New Order)
6. "Baroque Hoedown" (They Might Be Giants)
7. "Close to the Edge" (Yes)

== Awards ==
- Winner of Best Documentary at the 2004 Barcelona Inedit Film Festival

== See also ==
- Theremin: An Electronic Odyssey
