= Hans Fjellestad =

American musician (born 1968)

- Born: May 2, 1968 (age 58)
- Occupations: Pianist, composer, documentary filmmaker

Hans Fjellestad (born 1968) is an American pianist, music composer and documentary filmmaker based in Los Angeles.

== Early life ==
Hans Jorgen Fjellestad was born on May 2, 1968. He studied music composition and improvisation at University of California, San Diego in San Diego, California.

== Career ==
A classically trained pianist, he has composed for film, video, theater, dance and has toured with his music and film work throughout the U.S., Canada, Europe, Australia, Japan, Taiwan, New Zealand, Mexico, and Brazil.

In 2002, he directed his first documentary film, Frontier Life. It explores Tijuana, Mexico, with a focus on the local underground electronic music scene.

Two years later, in 2004, he directed Moog, the feature-length documentary about music synthesizer pioneer Robert Moog, which premiered at the Karlovy Vary International Film Festival. In 2009, he was the writer and producer for the 2009 music documentary The Heart Is A Drum Machine with Juliette Lewis, Elijah Wood, John Frusciante, and Jason Schwartzman. In 2010, he released a film about Depression-era life and art, When The World Breaks, which premiered at the 2010 Doc Edge Festival in New Zealand.

In 2012, he directed the documentary Sunset Strip, which premiered at SXSW 2012 and was broadcast on Showtime. The Hollywood Reporter describes it as "entertaining almost to a fault, this color-packed doc boasts a lifetime's worth of glamour and sleaze" featuring Mickey Rourke, Johnny Depp, Ozzy Osbourne, Keanu Reeves, Sofia Coppola, Hugh Hefner, Sharon Stone, Courtney Love, among others.

He co-founded the Trummerflora Collective, and has worked as a curator/producer for the international art initiative, inSite 05. He was artist-in-residence at the Steve Allen Theater in Hollywood 2008-2011, curating and hosting the monthly live music series ResBox.

He is directing a new documentary about the offshore radio outfit Radio Caroline, currently shooting in London and planned for 2014 release.

=== Music ===
He has an extensive discography both as a solo artist and in collaboration with many musicians in the international experimental music scene including Muhal Richard Abrams, George Lewis, Peter Kowald, Lé Quan Ninh, Lisle Ellis, Haco, Miya Masaoka, Money Mark, Yoshimi P-We, Thomas Dimuzio, G.E. Stinson, Damon Holzborn (with whom he forms the duo Donkey), Tetsu Saitoh, David Slusser, Baiyon, Kazuhisa Uchihashi, Jakob Riis, P.O. Jørgens, Carl Bergstrøm-Nielsen, Mike Keneally, Nortec Collective, among many others. His music is available on Hollywood Records, Accretions Records, Circumvention Music, Brain Escape Sandwich, Barely Auditable Records, Pan Handler and Vinyl Communications.

He usually records and performs under his own name, but has sporadically employed his alter-ego 33, as with performances at The Roxy in Prague and Bimbo's 365 Club in San Francisco. His track "Abominatron" on the Moog original film soundtrack (Hollywood Records) is credited as 33. Strangely, 33 is also the title of Fjellestad's 2003 solo cd (Accretions Records), making the artist's intentions behind the moniker somewhat unclear.

Kobe Live House (Accretions Records) was released in February 2006 and is a prime example of how the keyboardist approaches his unconventional mix of acoustic and electronic sounds. Recorded live on October 17, 2003, at Big Apple (a jazz club in Chūō-ku, Kobe, Japan) the concert was part of the club's 14th Anniversary Special Concert Series. Both sets are unedited and appear as they did the night of the show in Kobe, performed with a grand piano, Nord Lead 3 synthesizer and a custom software instrument programmed in MaxMSP. More recently, his music projects in the studio and on the stage are produced entirely on analog electronic instruments (mainly Moog) as with his 2007 release.
