= Ondine (typeface) =

Script typeface

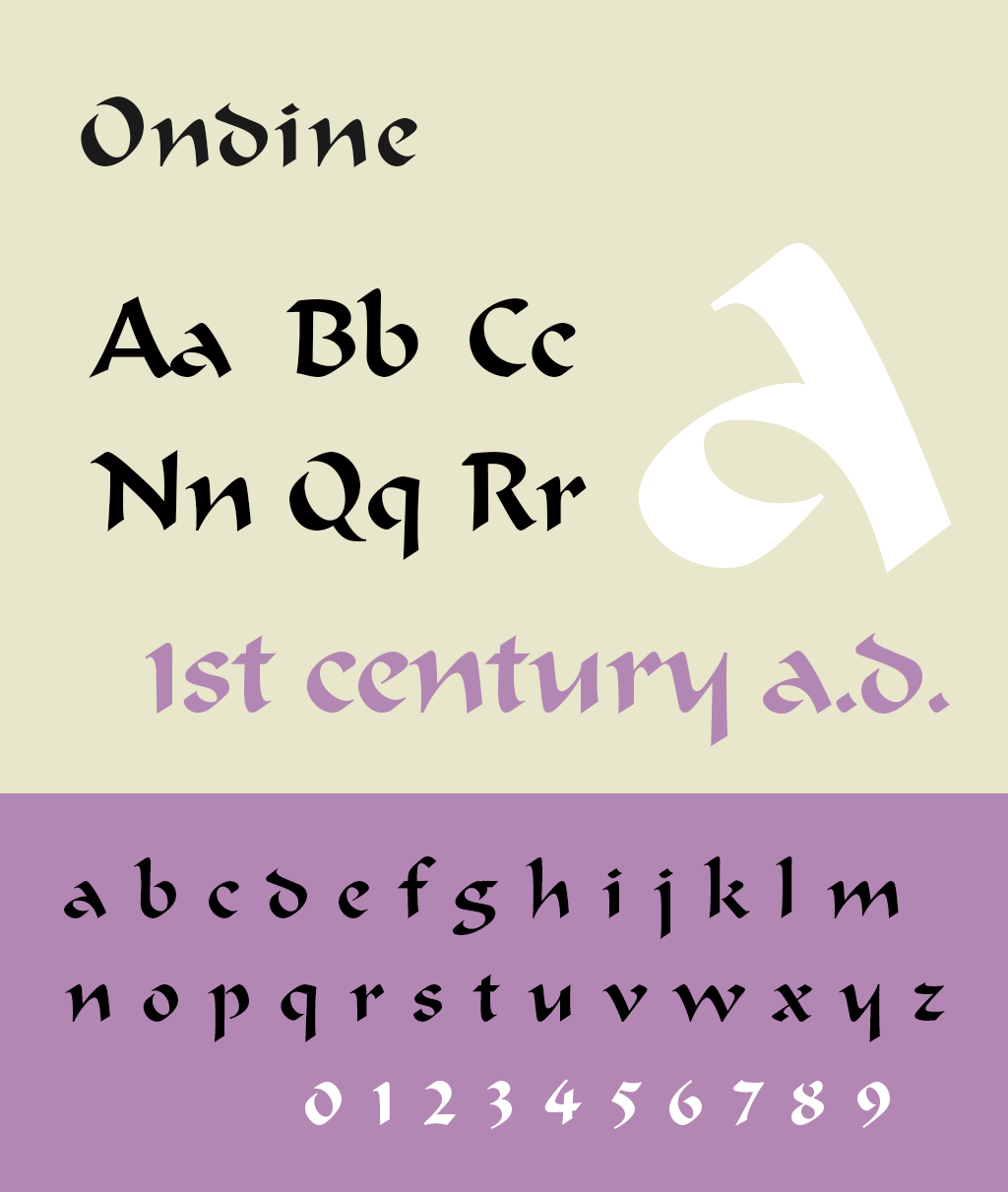
- Category: Script, Display
- Designer: Adrian Frutiger
- Commissioned by: Deberny & Peignot
- Date released: 1954
- Re-issuing foundries: Linotype, Adobe

Ondine is a script typeface designed by Adrian Frutiger in 1954 for the Deberny & Peignot font foundry.

Unlike popular script fonts such as Mistral and Choc by Roger Excoffon, Ondine appears somewhat stiff due to its pointed terminals and its unusual upright stance, which is not typical for script fonts. Described as "thick-nibbed calligraphic font with Arabic overtones," it is one of Frutiger's earliest type designs, and the only script face he ever created.

Ondine traces its roots to handwriting in the humanist era, a high point of Italian Renaissance typography in the 15th century. Although the humanist era is its main historical influence, there are multiple historical references visible, for example majuscule italics of Roman times. As such, Ondine is not necessarily a copy of any particular letterform; instead, it represents a blend of different styles.

Ondine's shapes were drawn using a broad pen and cut out of card stock with scissors, hence the character shapes featuring un-closed bowls. The typeface has gently swelling strokes, sharp terminals, and the illusion of a very slight back slant in its design. Frutiger recalls the process of the design of Ondine:

I picked the shapes that worked best. To finish those with opaque white and black ink would have taken me too long, so I wrote the letters with a broad pen on tracing paper and put them in the enlarger. I produced precise drawings from these, used white transfer paper to copy the type to black card, and then cut the letters out with scissors. If a detail was incorrect, I would cut something off or do letters again if need be. That way I quickly produced black and white originals, my speedy method for final artwork.

Charles Foster comments that "Although it has no oriental connection, [Ondine] has remained popular down the years with the designers of Chinese restaurant menus."
