= Peignot (typeface) =

Typeface

- Category: Unicase stressed sans-serif
- Designer: A. M. Cassandre
- Foundry: Deberny & Peignot
- Date created: 1937
- Re-issuing foundries: Production Type
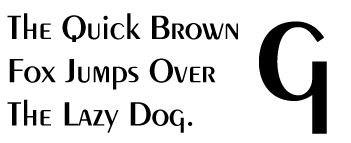
- Sample

Peignot is a sans-serif display typeface, designed by the poster artist A. M. Cassandre in 1937. It was commissioned by the French type foundry Deberny & Peignot.

The typeface is notable for not having a traditional lowercase, but in its place a "multi-case" combining traditional lowercase and small capital characters. Cassandre intended for Peignot to be used in publishing and stated that "[t]here is no technical reason in printing why we cannot return to the noble classical shapes of the alphabet and discard the lower case forms."

The typeface achieved some popularity in poster and advertising publishing from its release through the late 1940s. Stylistically Peignot is a "stressed" or modulated sans-serif in the Art Deco style, in which the vertical strokes are clearly wider than the horizontals. Use of Peignot declined with the growth of the International Typographic Style, which favored less decorative, more objective, traditional typefaces such as Akzidenz-Grotesk.

Production Type holds the rights to Peignot and has digitized the font since 2023.

A very similar typeface, Chambord by Roger Excoffon, was released by the Fonderie Olive in Marseille in 1945; it had a traditional lowercase.

== Reception ==
Peignot drew immediate criticism from the professional printing community on its release. Writing in Le Courrier Graphique in November 1937, critic Georges Dangon argued that Peignot's mixed-case system was in fact less readable than text set entirely in capitals, a rejection of the logic Cassandre had used to justify the design. Master printer Henri Colas, writing in the same periodical the following month, was more direct: "Peignot is an error. A typeface should not be the result of a theory."

In practice, printers bought Peignot's uppercase characters and rejected the complete font sets. Roger Excoffon's Chambord from 1945 drew on Peignot's aesthetic but incorporated a conventional lowercase. It found broader commercial acceptance.

== See also ==
- Samples of display typefaces
