= Banco (typeface) =

- Category: Display
- Designer: Roger Excoffon
- Foundry: Olive
- Date released: 1951
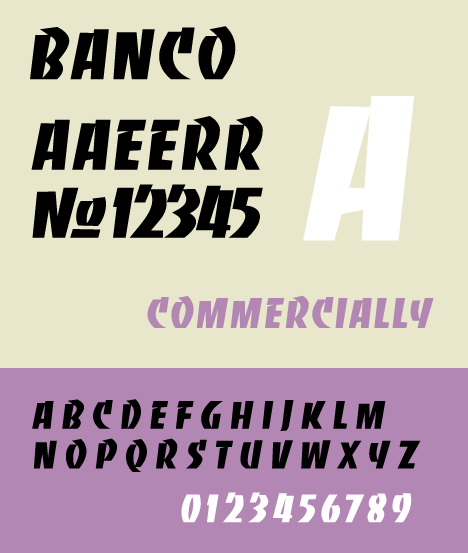
- Sample

Banco is an inclined titling typeface designed by Roger Excoffon for the Fonderie Olive foundry in 1951.

== History ==
Like Excoffon's later fonts Mistral and Choc, Banco was designed to be eye-catching, with what designer Cyrus Highsmith called an "outspoken flair."

The font was considered old-fashioned and unappealing by designers of the time, and after launch it was primarily used by small businesses in Europe. The font's popularity was renewed when it appeared on the cover of Bob Marley's 1974 album Natty Dread, and subsequently on many other reggae records. The skateboarding magazine Thrasher, which was heavily influenced by reggae and dub culture, adopted it for its 1981 launch and later issues. It was used on the PK Ripper BMX, the tv series Darkwing Duck or the video game Shinobi Legions.

While Excoffon did not design a lowercase alphabet for Banco, Phill Grimshaw and the ITC font foundry released a lighter-weight version of the font in 2000, which included lowercase letters. Banco was also translated into Cyrillic in 2000.

== Corporate identity uses ==
- Munhwa Broadcasting Corporation (MBC) - Korean television broadcasters logo in 1986–2005

== See also ==
- Samples of display typefaces
