= Antique Olive =

- Category: Sans-serif
- Classification: Humanist sans-serif
- Designer: Roger Excoffon
- Foundry: Fonderie Olive
- Date released: 1958–1971
- Design based on: Gill Sans

Antique Olive is a humanist sans-serif typeface ("antique" being equivalent to sans-serif in French typographic conventions). Along the lines of Gill Sans, it was designed beginning in the late 1950s by French typographer Roger Excoffon, an art director and former consultant to the Marseille based Fonderie Olive.

Essentially an extrapolation of a 1958 ultra-bold Excoffon design known as Nord, the regular Antique Olive romain would be released in 1960, followed by the squarish Antique Olive compact the next year. Medium, bold, wide, and condensed versions, with italics, would be designed and released from 1964 through 1971. The regular Antique Olive family features subtle flares and ink traps.

Lewis Blackwell later commented on the design: "An attempt to offer a more refined sans serif than presented by Helvetica and Univers, but it was too characterful and too late to be widely adopted outside France."

The face was later made available in cold type and digital versions are now offered by Adobe Systems and Linotype. A limited set of styles digitized by URW++ are available with GhostPDL (part of the Ghostscript project) under the Aladdin Free Public License.

The font is also sold as a 13-member family called "Antigone" by SoftMaker.

== Nord and Air France ==
Logo of Air France from 1975, displaying wordmark designed by Excoffon in 1958, which served as the basis of Nord

In 1958, two years after becoming artistic director for Air France, Roger Excoffon designed a new block-letter logo and livery for the airline. This lettering would be tweaked and expanded into a full typeface later that year, released by Fonderie Olive as Nord. Once the Antique Olive family had been created in the 1960s and became well established, the typeface was rechristened Antique Olive Nord in 1964. This wordmark would survive through three rebrands in 51 years until a total overhaul in 2009.

== Notable uses ==
Michelin’s corporate logo from 1966 to 1997 was set in Nord.

American discount retailer Sky City adopted a logo set in Antique Olive in July 1976, which it would use until its bankruptcy in 1991.

American discount retailer Wal-Mart began using Antique Olive in March 1977, when it began to appear occasionally in advertisements. It found its way onto an increasing amount of generic products and grew to be adopted for store signage and most text in Wal-Mart's advertisements by 1980, even being prominently displayed on that year's annual report. The typeface would then be used for the company's next two corporate logos, from 1981 until 2008, while usage of Antique Olive in advertising disappeared by the mid-1990s.

Wal-Mart's membership wholesale club chain Sam's Club, introduced in 1983 at the height of the company's usage of the typeface, used Antique Olive in the chain's inaugural logo. Surviving a name change in 1990, it appeared in the store's identity until a total rebrand in 2006.

Canadian discount retailer Giant Tiger has used Antique Olive Compact in its logo since 1985.

Natural beverage company Odwalla used Antique Olive in its logo from 1985 until 2013.

Former American computer hardware manufacturer Supra Corporation, the former Microbits Peripheral Products, used Antique Olive Compact for its first logo under the new name in 1986.

Antique Olive Compact has been used for the titles of all mainline films and spin-offs of the The Fast and the Furious franchise since 2001.

Since its launch in 2013, Antique Olive Compact has been used in the logos of American cable news channel One America News Network.

It was also used in the ending credits of Sesame Street from 1978 until 1983, and on Cartoon Network's Ben 10: Alien Force and Ben 10: Ultimate Alien.

== Modern interpretations ==
Robert Huber designed LL Moderne in 2017, based on Antique Olive.

Kontour Type designed Utile in 2019, inspired by Antique Olive.

As bespoke corporate typefaces have been a focal point for rebrands in the 2020s, both Vinamilk and Walmart have developed new identities using typefaces heavily modeled on Antique Olive:

- Vinamilk's VNM Sans family was designed by Yellow Type Foundry for their July 2023 rebrand, which was led by Duy Đào of Studio DUY and Karin Fyhrie of Sovereign Objects. Two of the four typefaces, VNM Sans Display (condensed, used in updated logotype) and VNM Display Standard (regular text), are heavily derived from Antique Olive, with softened edges.
- Walmart's Everyday Sans family was designed by Christian Schwartz of Commercial Type for their January 2025 rebrand, which was led by Walmart Creative Studio and Jones Knowles Ritchie. It encompasses four typefaces: Everyday Sans, Everyday Sans Headline (for large text), and Everyday Sans UI (for web), in five weights each with italics, and Everyday Sans Mono (monospaced) in two weights. The typeface is the centerpiece of the new campaign, which is a revival of the design and iconography of the chain's older, Antique Olive-laden advertising.
