= Dick Dooijes =

Dutch type designer and typographer (1909–1998)

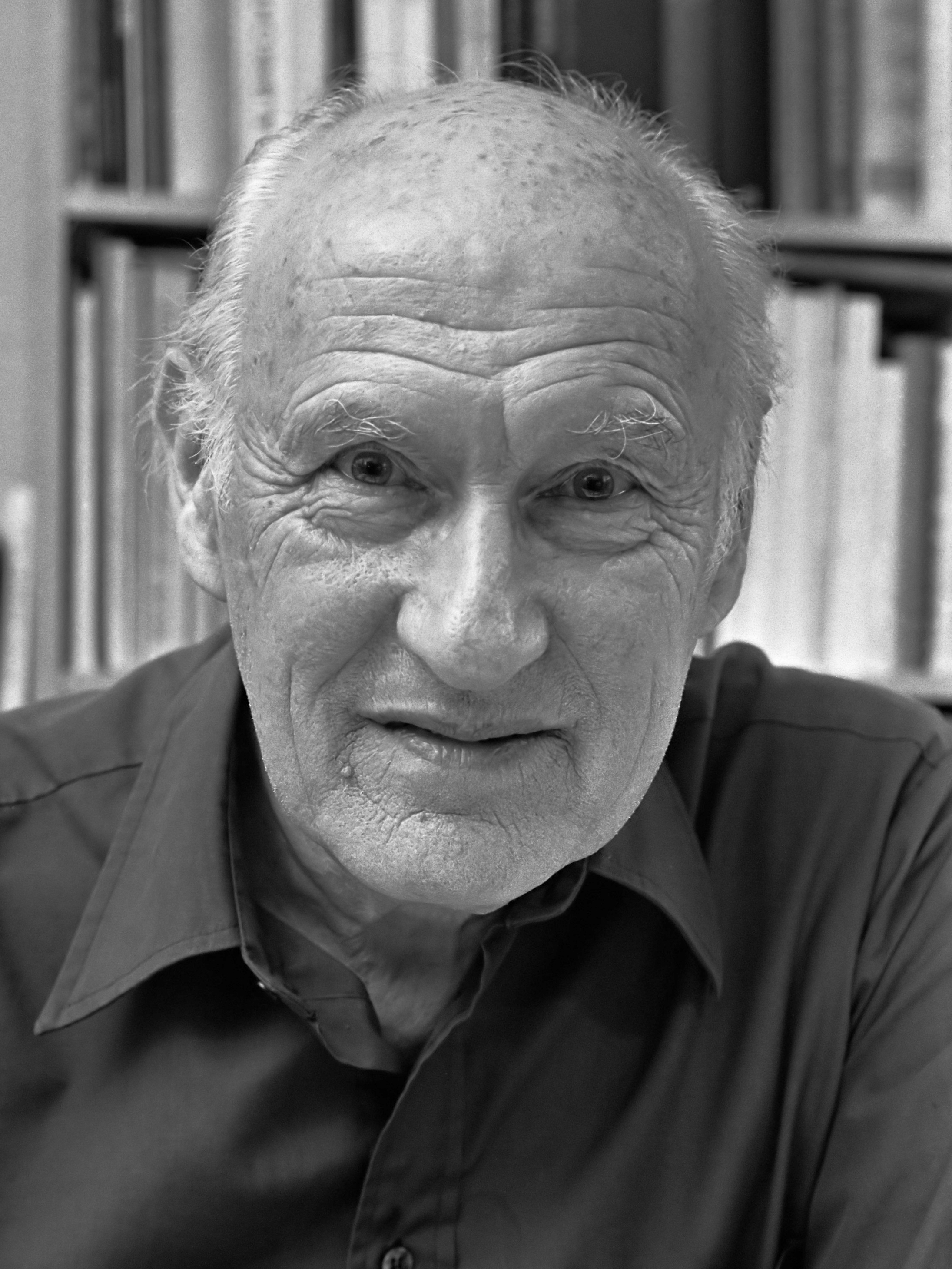
- Dooijes in 1978
- Born: May 6, 1909; Amsterdam, Netherlands
- Died: June 20, 1998 (aged 89); Baarn, Netherlands
- Occupations: Typeface designer

Dick Dooijes (May 6, 1909 – June 20, 1998) was a Dutch typeface designer. He worked at the Amsterdam Type Foundry for over forty years and directed the Gerrit Rietveld Academie from 1968 to 1974.

== Biography ==
Dick Dooijes was born in Amsterdam on May 6, 1909. He began working at Lettergieterij Amsterdam (the Amsterdam Type Foundry) in 1926 as S.H. de Roos's assistant and pupil. He worked with de Roos on the design of the typefaces Nobel and Egmont. In 1940, Dooijes succeeded de Roos as artistic director of Lettergieterij Amsterdam.

Dooijes' first solo typeface design was a Hebrew alphabet, which he could not read, created for Palestinian printing companies. With the outbreak of the Second World War, however, he was unable to contact potential clients and production on the typeface was abandoned. After the war, he completed Stefan Schlesinger's designs for Rondo following Schlesinger's death in a concentration camp. Rondo became a popular display typeface in the 1950s and 1960s, particularly on shopfronts and packaging. In 1959 Dooijes completed the sans-serif Mercator, his first complete type family, which shared similarities with Helvetica and Univers. He also designed Contura, released in 1965.

Lectura, Dooijes' final typeface, a serif, was released in 1969, seven years after he first conceived it. He had become slightly bitter with type design after realizing that he could have earned much more money from some of his designs if he had been a freelancer rather than an employee of the type foundry, as he was not entitled to royalties. He became director of the Gerrit Rietveld Academie in 1968 and remained in the position until 1974. After his retirement, he took up writing, publishing an autobiography titled Mijn leven met letters (My Life with Letters) and a book about Dutch typographers. He died on June 20, 1998, in Baarn.
