= Wyers (squat) =

Squatter's house in Amsterdam

Coordinates: 52.3755°N 4.8959°E

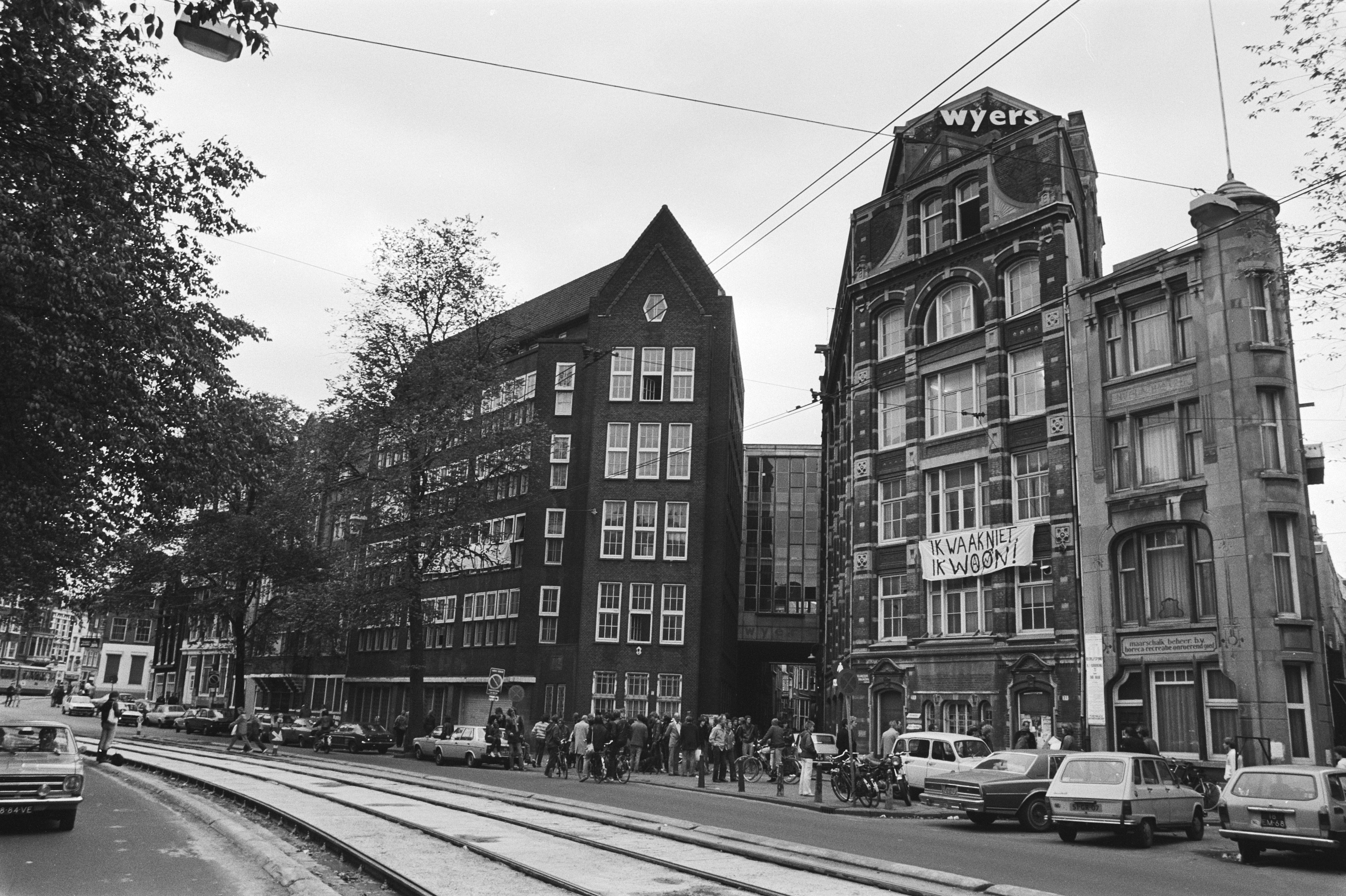
The squatted Wyers complex in October 1981

The Wyers (or Wijers) squat was a self-managed social centre on Nieuwezijds Voorburgwal in central Amsterdam, the Netherlands, between 1981 and 1984. The buildings of the Wyers former wholesale textile company were converted by the squatters into a range of living and work spaces. When the Government of Amsterdam decided to demolish the complex to make way for a Holiday Inn hotel, a car parking garage and apartments, the squatters made alternative proposals. The eviction was announced for February 14, 1984, and there were demonstrations in support of the squat around the country. On the day of eviction, 1,500 people stayed inside the building then left without conflict. The breeding place (broedplaats) discourse of new cultural initiatives presented by the squatters was later adopted by the city council.

== Wyers complex ==
The Wyers (or Wijers) complex was located on Nieuwezijds Voorburgwal near to Amsterdam Centraal station. Taking up an area of 10,000 m² between Nieuwendijk and Neuwezijds Armsteeg, the buildings housed the Wyers wholesale textile company which sold wool, linen and cotton fabric and items for interior decorating. There was a seven storey head office and 16 other buildings. By 1979, it was no longer feasible for the company to be based in the centre of Amsterdam, so it moved operations to Archangelkade in Amsterdam-West and Diemen, leaving the building empty.

== Occupation and initiatives ==
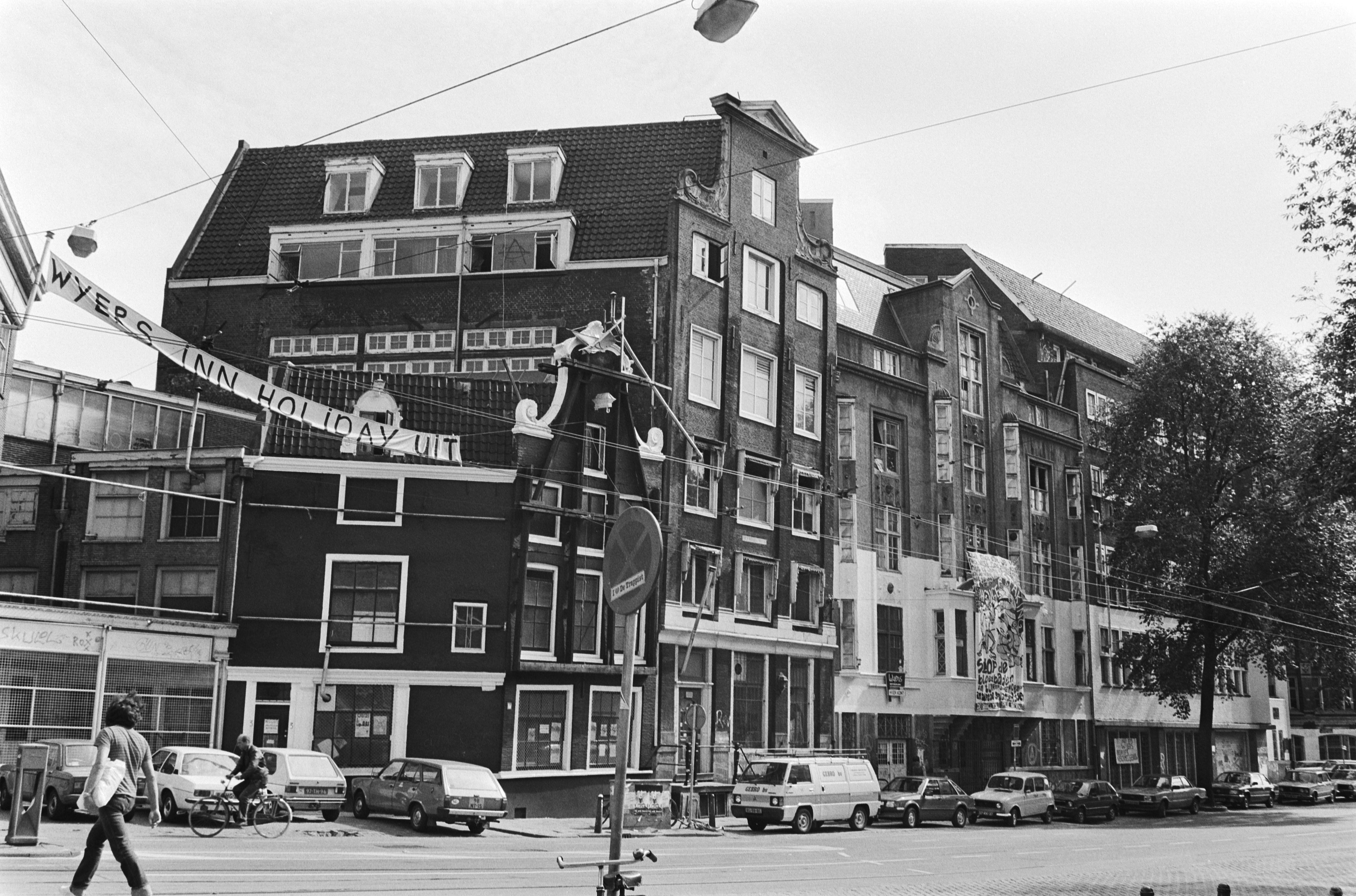
The Wyers complex in August 1983

In 1981, the complex of buildings was squatted by a group of 400 people. The Dutch squatters movement was at a high point in the early 1980s following incidents such as the Groote Keijser and the Vondelstraat riots, although it did suffer a setback with the eviction, resquat and second eviction of the Lucky Luyk (or Lucky Luijk) at the same time as the occupation of the Wyers complex.

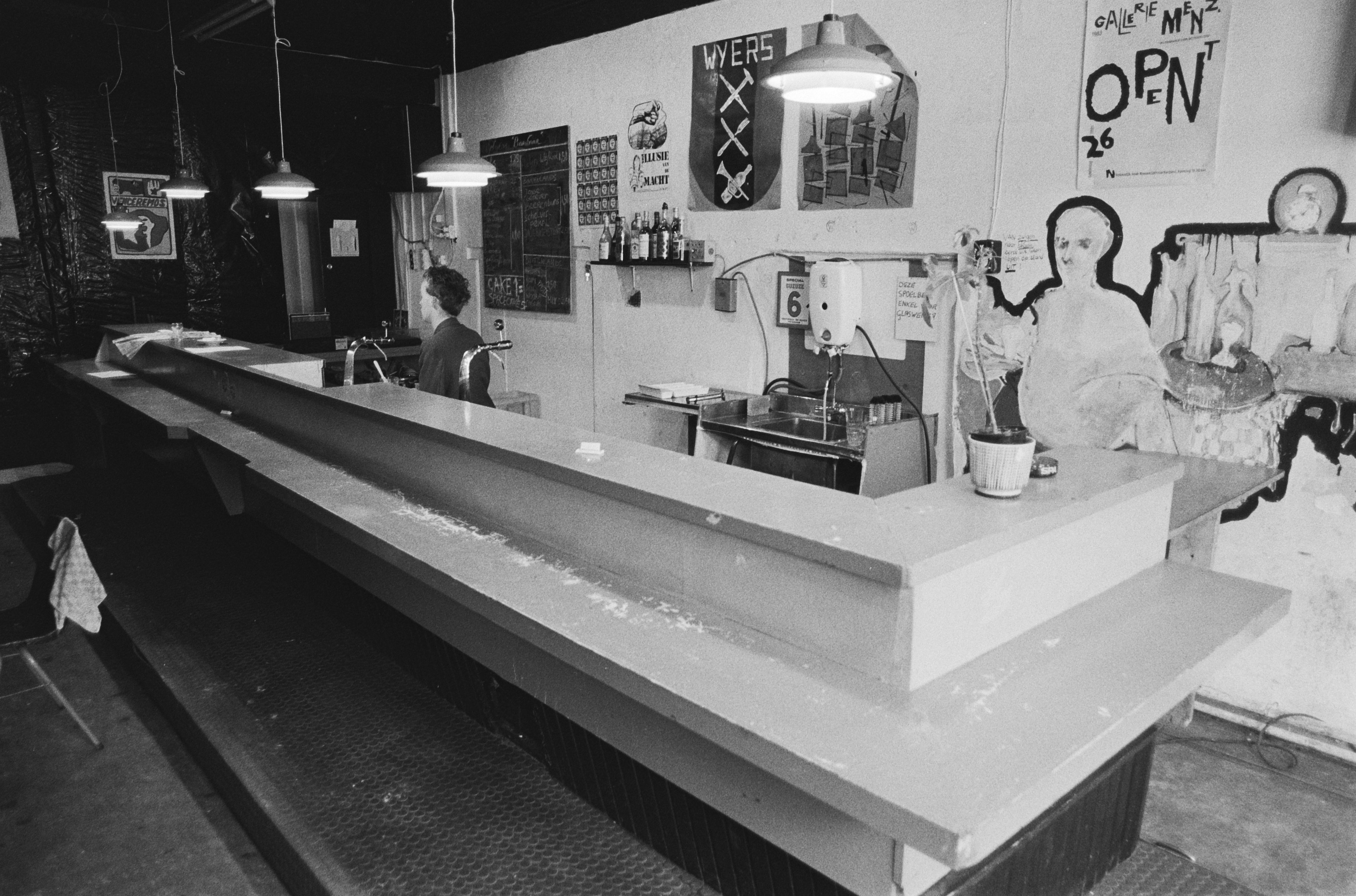
A bar at the Wyers complex

Wyers was the largest squat in Amsterdam and as well as housing 100 people, hosted many activities and organisations. Sociologist Lynn Owens writes that according to the Wyerskrant (the Wyers newspaper), in October 1983 the complex contained:

A restaurant, bar, café, cinema, performance spaces, night store, art gallery, convenience store, acupuncture clinic, theatre groups, rehearsal studios for musicians, artist studios, printing press, nursery, skateboard park, theater/music electronics workplace, wood recycling center, fine wood dealer, two woodworking studios, guitar builder, piano restoration, wind energy workplace, bicycle repair, ceramics workplace, audiovisual workplace with a school, taxi collective, delivery service, cargo bicycle rental, silk screening, photography collective, repair services for electronics and clothing, an environmentally friendly store, recycled products store, architecture firm, press bureau, accounting office, book store and printer, Aikido school, tea and herb store, windmill services, first aid services, and information offices for environmental and activist groups.

The complex developed into a self-managed social centre, with users meeting to discuss issues and paying 100 guilders every month into a maintenance fund. In reaction to an increasingly militant wing of the squatters movement in Amsterdam, the Wyers collective promoted hard work and a discourse of compromise with the authorities. It framed itself as a breeding place (broedplaats) of new cultural initiatives and therefore a useful part of the city. As well as catering to their own needs, the squatters provided services to the local community such as the restaurant Zoro's Zion, a nightshop and a shop selling goods at cost price. Operating alongside other squatted music venues such as OCCII and Vrankrijk, the 800 person concert room hosted performances by Divine, The Ex and Nina Hagen.

The Wyers complex had previously been ignored for development because of its size; after its occupation the Government of Amsterdam reacted in April 1983 by approving plans to demolish the site and construct a Holiday Inn hotel, apartments and a car park. The squatters were not invited to the meeting where the decision was made and reacted angrily since a hotel served visitors not residents and a parking garage was intended for cars instead of pedestrians and cyclists. The users of the complex formed the Wyers Work Congress and began public discussions about alternative plans for regeneration, which resulted in the publication Wyers in the city.

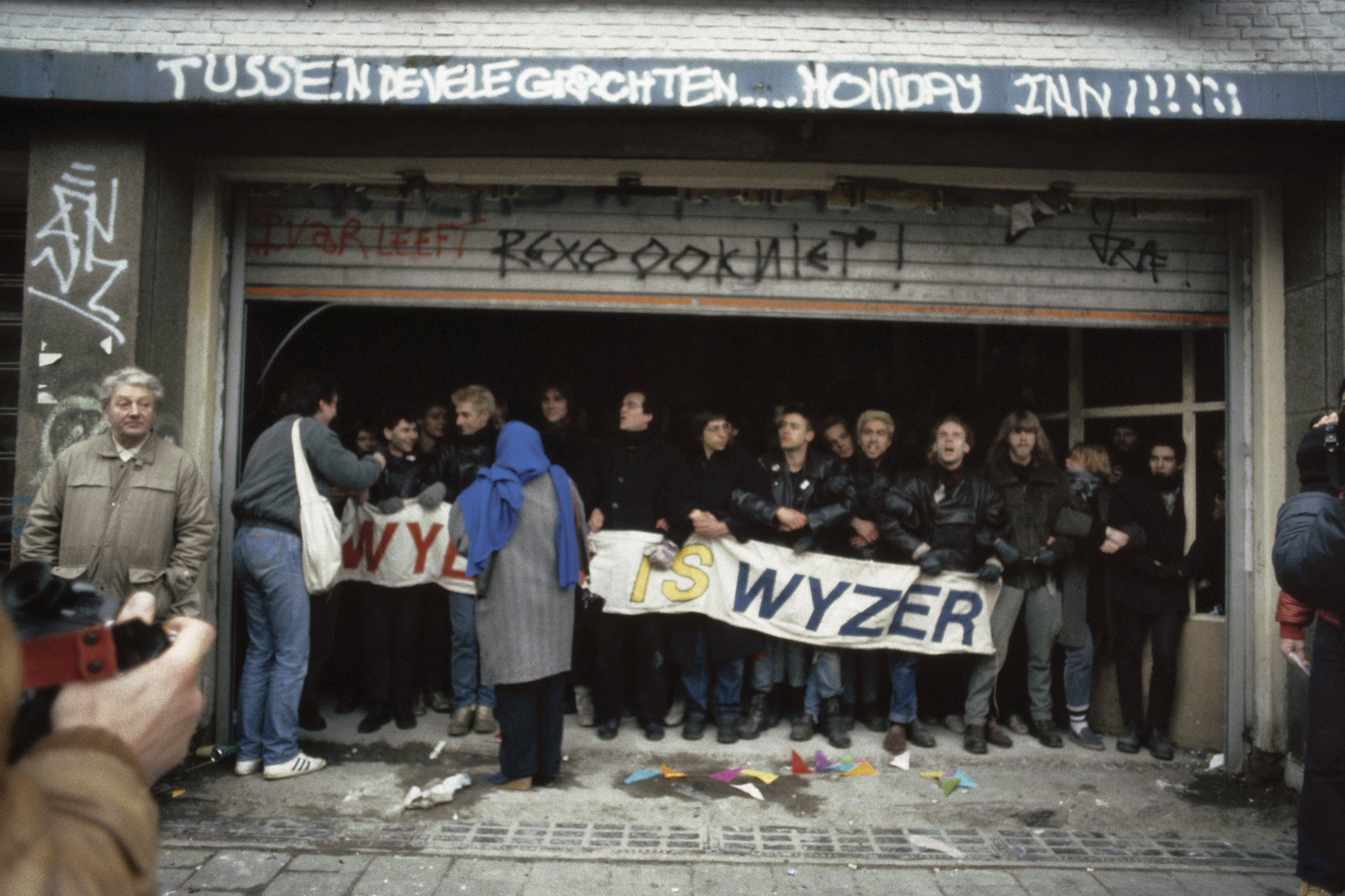
Squatters blockading an entrance to the Wyers complex on the day of eviction

The squatters argued that a hotel would bring relatively few menial jobs, whereas their project provided different sorts of employment opportunities as well as work experience for the unemployed. They also emphasised the cultural impact of their initiatives, which included 30 artist ateliers. Businesses using the complex pledged their support for the project; despite support from some PvDA (Labour Party) councillors, the city council decided to approve the demolition. It did offer the squatters a different location for their projects, namely six warehouses at the Entrepotdok. The Wyers collective was split between people who wanted to defend the squat as a symbol of self-organisation and others who were happy to relinquish the building and move their projects to a new location. This disagreement caused a debate within the national squatters movement, with articles being written in the squatters magazine Bluf!. The discussion paper "How yes can mean no" (Hoe ja toch nee kan zijn) argued that the movement should surprise the council by agreeing to take their offer, whilst the Wyers collective continued to hope it could stop the demolition and make a deal to legalise the occupation in situ. It organised the BAD (Brede Amsterdamse Diskussie or Whole Amsterdam Discussion) in order to discuss the options for regeneration in December 1983 and January 1984. The Entrepotdok warehouses were not seen as an attractive option since they were not in the city centre and they were smaller than the Wyers. Some of these warehouses were later squatted and evicted in 2000.

== Eviction and legacy ==
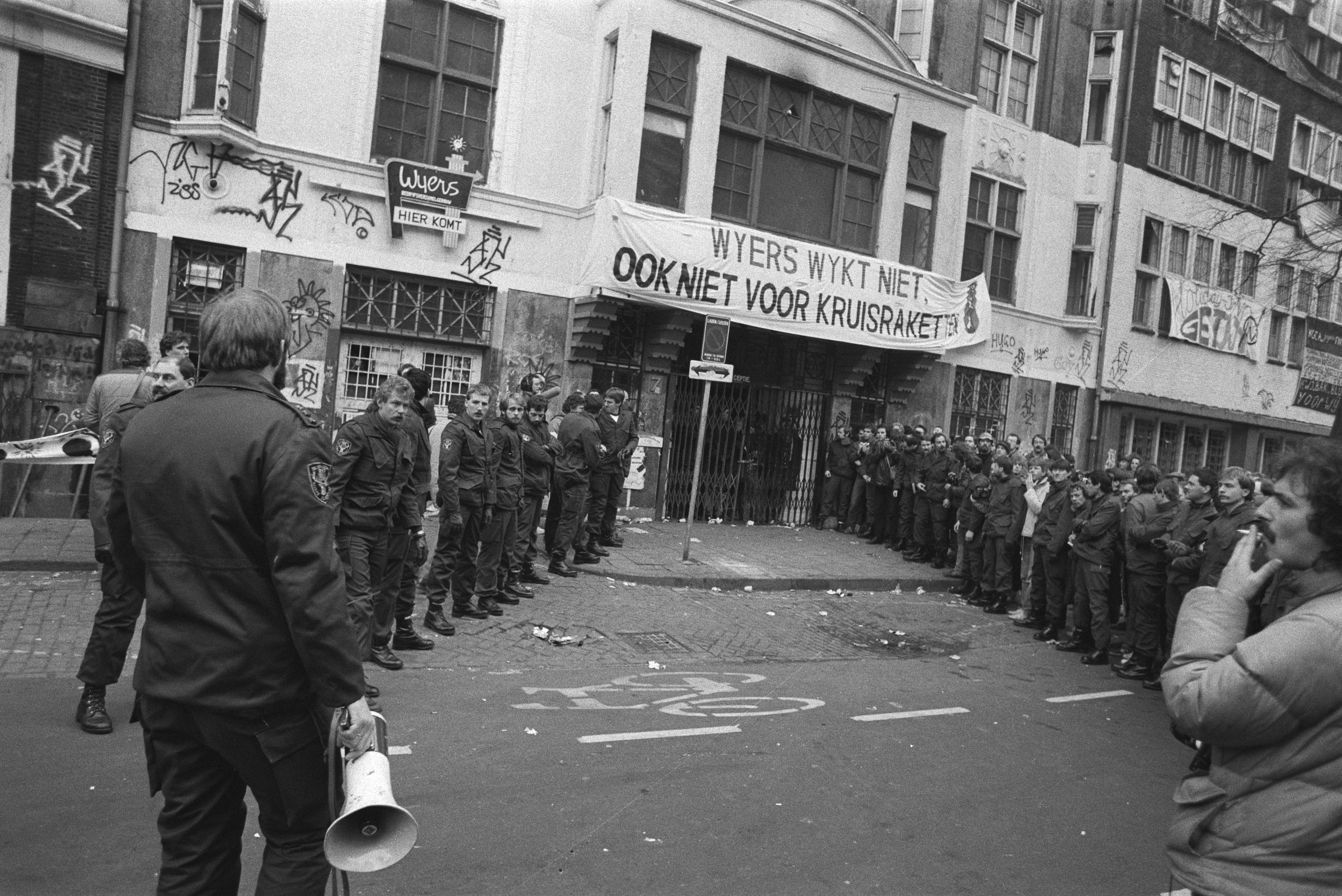
The eviction of the Wyers complex

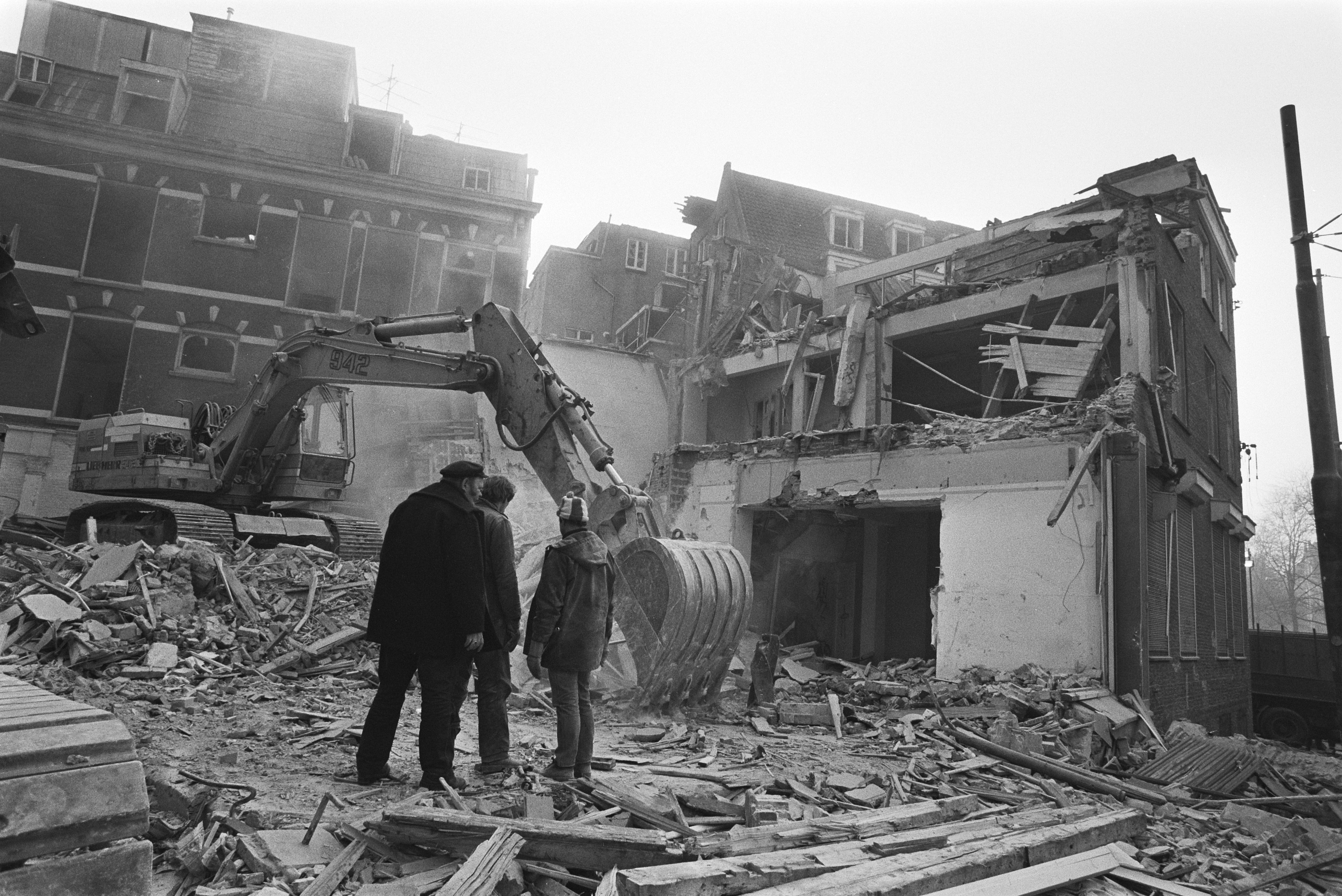
The Wyers complex being demolished in late February 1984

Mayor of Amsterdam Ed van Thijn decided to announce the eviction date (February 14) in advance, saying it was helpful for local residents to know and he wanted the eviction to proceed without conflict. The police said they would exercise self-control and if there was violence, it would come from the squatters. On the weekend before the eviction, squatters organised actions across the Netherlands in protest under the name Day of turmoil (Dag van de onrust); people briefly occupied Holiday Inn hotels in Leiden and Utrecht.

The Wyers complex was evicted on February 14, 1984, by around 700 police officers from the Mobiele Eenheid (ME – a police unit used for riot control). The eviction began at 10.00 after a last warning was given for people to leave the complex, and city buses were used to transport the squatters away from the building. Around 1,500 people peacefully and non-violently resisted, and the last people to leave the Wyers were applauded by the riot police. Van Thijn was able to watch the eviction live via recordings from a police helicopter and announced the eviction was complete at 15.00.

Debates continued within the squatters movement about what the correct strategy should have been at the eviction; the militant wing of the movement was frustrated that the Wyers was given up without conflict. An essay entitled "Squatting or shopkeeping" (Kraken of Grutten) heavily criticised the ideology of the Wyers collective. By the mid-1990s, the breeding place (broedplaats) discourse was adopted by the city council as a form of regeneration and some squatted buildings were legalised as live/work spaces, such as NDSM, Nieuw en Meer, Plantage Doklaan and Tetterode. In the 2020s, there are around 60 such projects in Amsterdam. A Crowne Plaza hotel stands on the site of the former Wyers complex.

== See also ==
- Vrankrijk – a nearby self-managed social centre
