= Cassandre =

French painter and designer (1901–1968)

Adolphe Jean-Marie Mouron
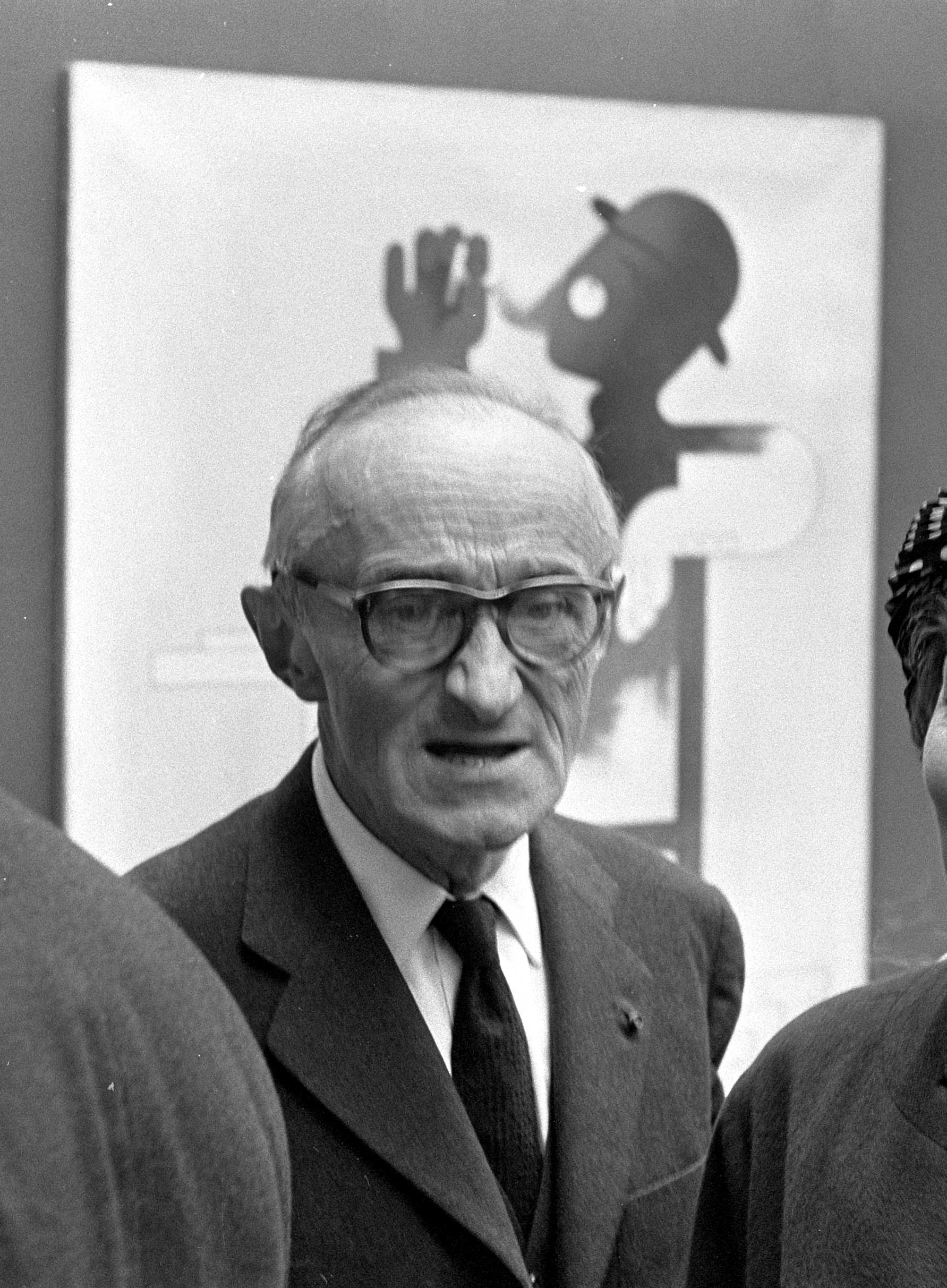
- A.M. Cassandre in 1967
- Born: 24 January 1901; Kharkov, Kharkov Governorate, Russian Empire
- Died: 17 June 1968 (aged 67); Paris, France
- Occupations: Painter, commercial poster artist, typeface designer

A.M. Cassandre, pseudonym of Adolphe Jean-Marie Mouron (24 January 1901 – 17 June 1968), was a Ukrainian-French artist and graphic designer known for his celebrated Art Deco posters and typeface designs.

== Early life and career ==
He was born Adolphe Jean-Marie Mouron to French parents in Kharkov, the capital of Kharkov Governorate in the Russian Empire and located in the historical region of Sloboda Ukraine. At age fourteen, he moved to Paris, where he studied at the École des Beaux-Arts and at the Académie Julian. He began working for Hachhard & Cie, a Parisian printing house, at age 22 to support his artistic goals. Influenced by Cubism and the machine aesthetic of Purism, Cassandre won a grand prize at the 1925 Exposition Internationale des Arts Décoratifs et Industriels Modernes with the poster Au Bûcheron, made for the French furniture store Le Bûcheron (the Lumberjack) in 1923.

Cassandre became successful enough that with the help of partners he was able to set up his own advertising agency called Alliance Graphique, serving a wide variety of clients during the 1930s. He is perhaps best known for his posters advertising travel, for clients such as the Compagnie Internationale des Wagons-Lits. He was a pioneer of airbrush arts.

His creations for the Dubonnet wine company were among the first posters designed in a manner that allowed them to be seen by occupants in moving vehicles. His posters are memorable for their innovative graphic solutions and their frequent references to such artists including Max Ernst and Pablo Picasso. He also taught graphic design at the École des Arts Décoratifs and then at the École d'Art Graphique.

With typography an important part of poster design, the company created several new typeface styles. Cassandre developed Bifur in 1929, the sans serif Acier Noir in 1935, and in 1937 an all-purpose font called Peignot.

In 1936, a Museum of Modern Art exhibition in New York City, Posters by Cassandre, showcased 26 of his works For the next several years, Cassandre received commissions from American magazines including Harper's Bazaar and Fortune.

== Later career ==
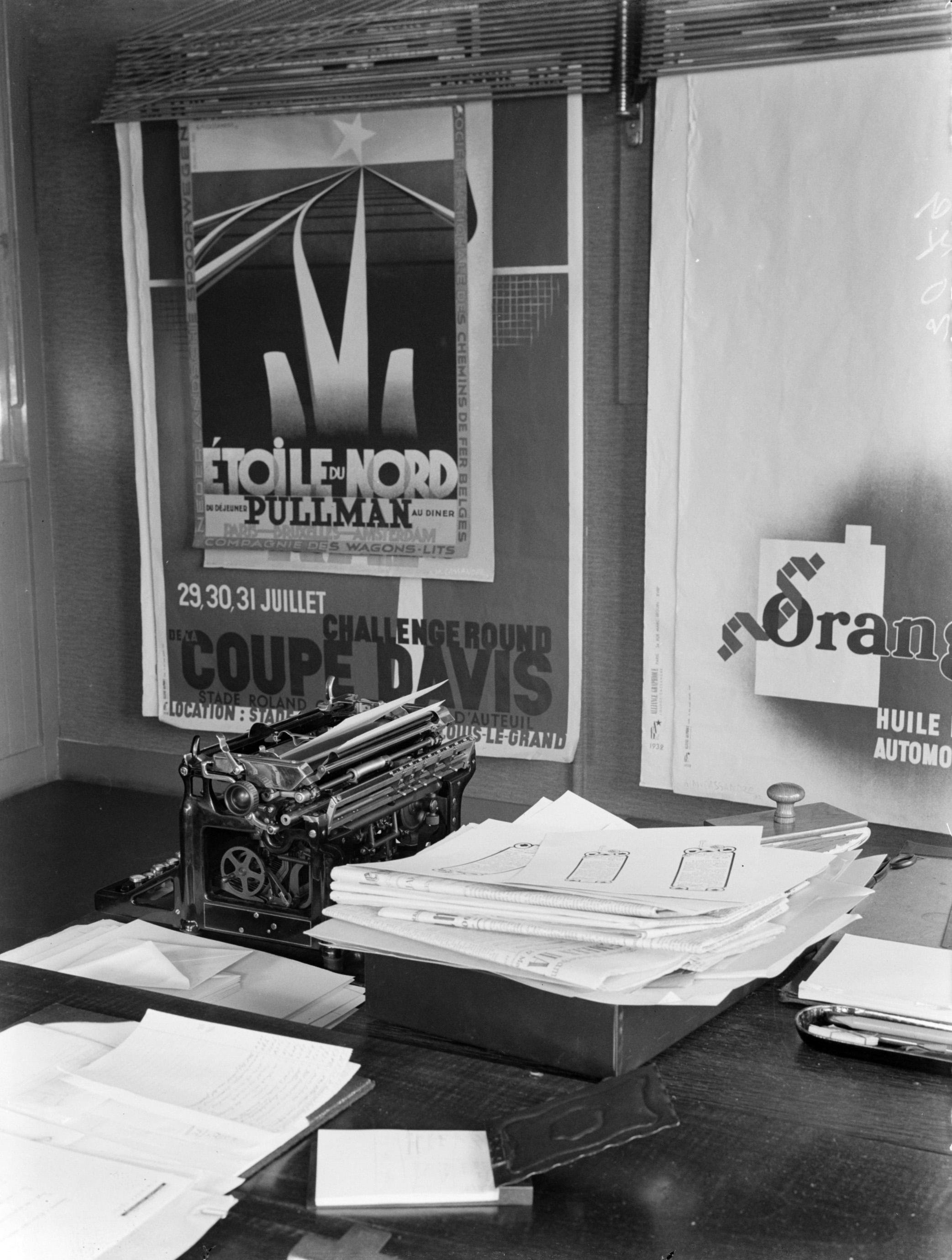
Poster of Etoile Du Nord in a workroom

With the onset of World War II, Cassandre served in the French army until the fall of France. His business long gone, he survived by creating stage sets and costumes for the theatre, something he had dabbled in during the 1930s. After the war, he continued this line of work while also returning to easel painting. He worked with several famous French fashion houses, designing playing cards and scarves for Hermès and the well-known Yves Saint Laurent logo.

In his later years, Cassandre suffered from bouts of depression prior to his suicide in Paris in June 1968. He was buried in the Parisian Montparnasse Cemetery (8th division).

In 1985, his son Henri Mouron published a study of his father's work in a book titled A.M. Cassandre.

== Typeface designs ==
Cassandre designed several typefaces issued by the Deberny & Peignot foundry: Bifur in 1929, a display face with a reduced geometric structure intended for advertising headlines; Acier in 1930; and Peignot in 1937, the latter used for the official communications of the 1937 Exposition Internationale des Arts et Techniques dans la Vie Moderne in Paris.

- Acier Noir (1930)
- Bifur (1929)
- Peignot (1937)
- Touraine (1947), with Charles Peignot

== Notable poster designs ==
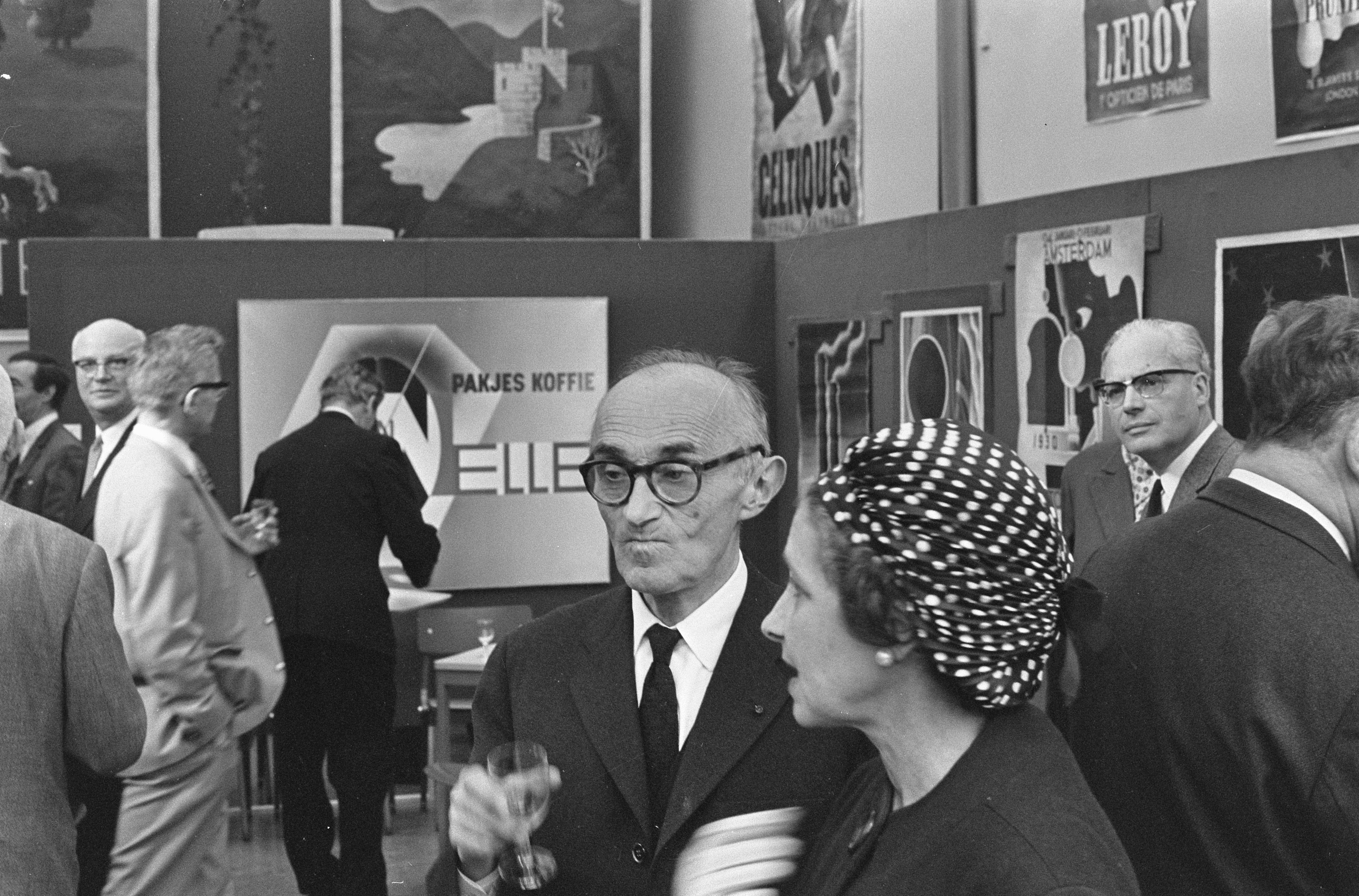
Opening of the decor and poster exhibition by A. M. Cassandre at the Rijksacademie, Amsterdam, 1967

- Nord Express, 1927
- Etoile Du Nord, 1927
- La Route Bleue, 1929
- Chemin De Fer Du Nord, 1929
- L’ Atlantique, 1931
- Triplex, 1930
- Dubonnet, 1932
- Normandie, 1935
