= Nobel (typeface) =

Geometric sans-serif typeface

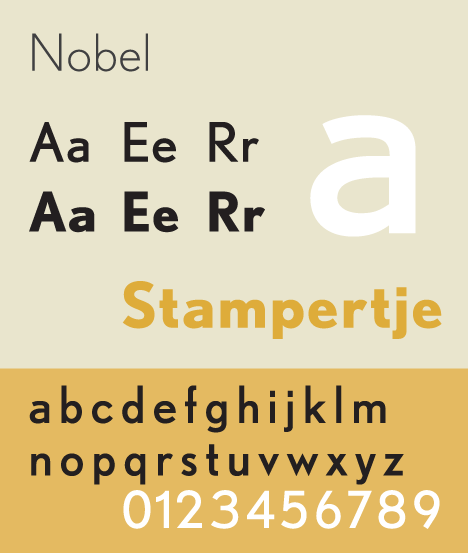
- Category: Sans-serif
- Classification: Geometric sans-serif
- Designers: Sjoerd Hendrik de Roos; Dick Dooijes
- Foundry: Amsterdam Type Foundry; Intertype
- Date released: 1929

Nobel is a geometric sans-serif typeface designed by Sjoerd Henrik de Roos (1877–1962) and Dick Dooijes (1909–1998) in the period 1929–1935 for the Amsterdam Type foundry. Capitalizing upon Lettergieterij Amsterdam's substantial financial interest in the Berlin typefoundry H. Berthold AG, de Roos decided as a Dutch competitor to Futura to license the Berthold foundry's geometric Berthold Grotesk, change some characters and sell it in the Netherlands under this name. The resulting face became very popular in Dutch printing.

Andrea Fuchs and Fred Smeijers produced a revival for the Dutch Type Library (DTL) in 1993, using the archives of Lettergieterij Amsterdam. In the same year in the United States, Tobias Frere-Jones, then at Font Bureau, began a revival of the Nobel face. Cyrus Highsmith and Dyana Weissman later added the light weights. Frere-Jones described it as an interesting compromise between the purer geometry of Futura and traditional letters: "Futura cooked in dirty pots and pans."

Nobel WGL is a global version of Nobel used by Lexus in its literature and marketing materials. Nobel WGL also supports Turkish, Greek, Cyrillic, Vietnamese and Pan-European languages.

Canadian type designer Ray Larabie designed Mesmerize typeface that inspired from Nobel and available in 40 styles (Expanded, Extended, Normal, Semi Condensed, Condensed, Ultra Light, Extra Light, Light, Book, Regular, Semi Bold, Bold, Extra Bold) with italics. Canada1500 which in turn, a pan-Unicode expansion of select weights of Mesmerize to include broader language support — as it was designed to cover all the languages of Canada as the official typeface for the Canadian sesquicentennial.

== Bibliography ==
- Friedl, Friedrich, Nicholas Ott and Bernard Stein. Typography: An Encyclopedic Survey of Type Design and Techniques Through History. Black Dog & Leventhal: 1998. ISBN 1-57912-023-7.
- Jaspert, Berry and Johnson. Encyclopaedia of Type Faces. Cassell Paperback, London; 2001. ISBN 1-84188-139-2
- Macmillan, Neil. An A–Z of Type Designers. Yale University Press: 2006. ISBN 0-300-11151-7.
- Middendorp, Jan. Dutch Type. 010 Publishers: 2004. ISBN 978-90-6450-460-0.
