= Tetterode =

Complex of buildings in Amsterdam-West

Coordinates: 52.3680°N 4.8720°E

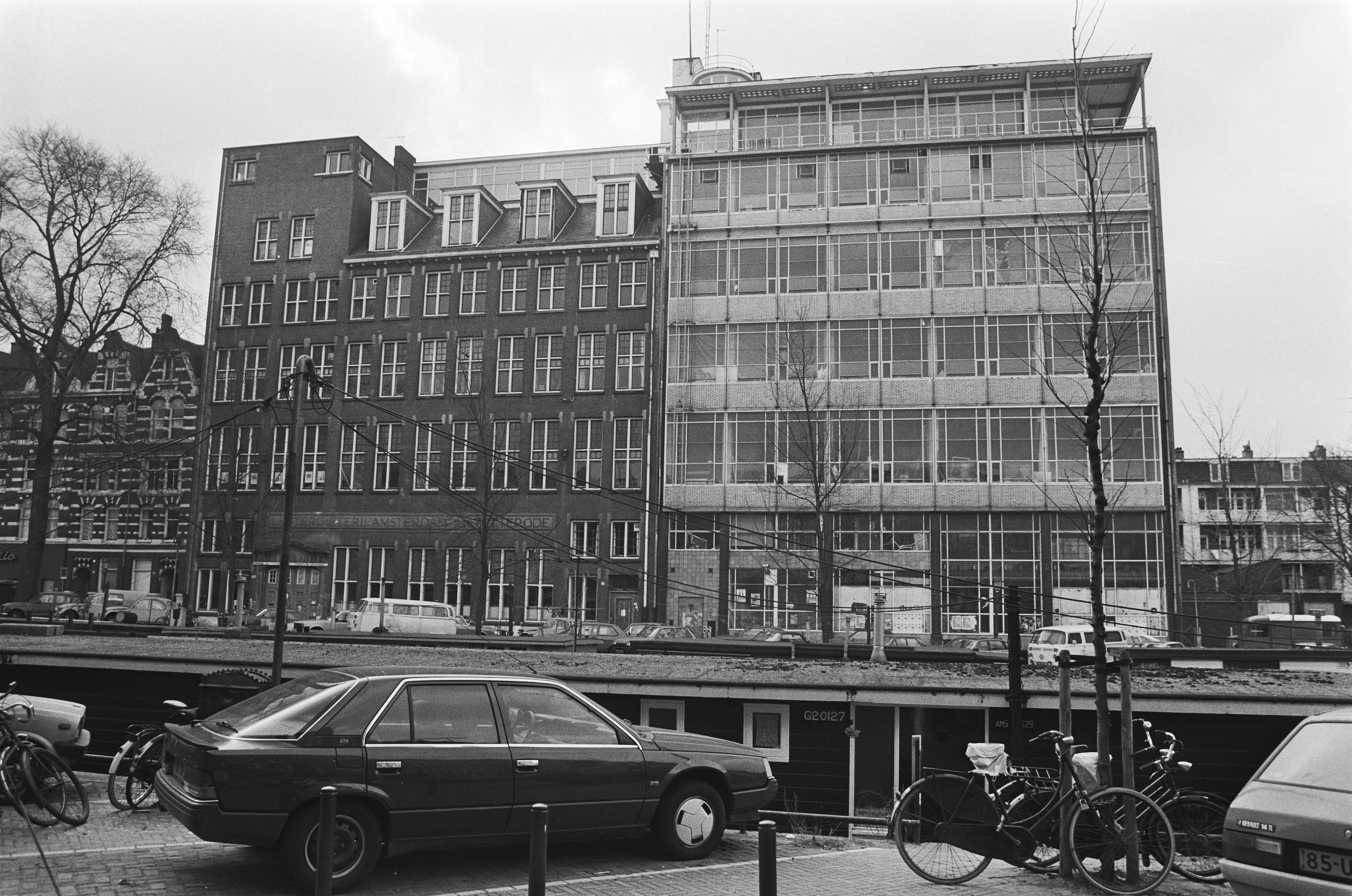
Tetterode complex in 1986, seen from across the Da Costakade

Tetterode is a complex of buildings in Amsterdam-West in the Netherlands. Built as the Amsterdam Type Foundry from 1902 onwards for the Tetterode print company, the site was left derelict in 1980. After plans were announced to demolish the buildings, they were squatted in 1981 and later legalized in 1986. Tetterode hosts or has hosted a range of activities including an art gallery, arts and crafts workshops, a citizens advice centre, a clothes shop, the Eddie the Eagle museum, a gay and lesbian disco, a hairdresser, a kindergarten (called De Tettertjes), a stencil printers, a shoemaker and a theatre. In 2021 it celebrated its fortieth anniversary.

== History ==
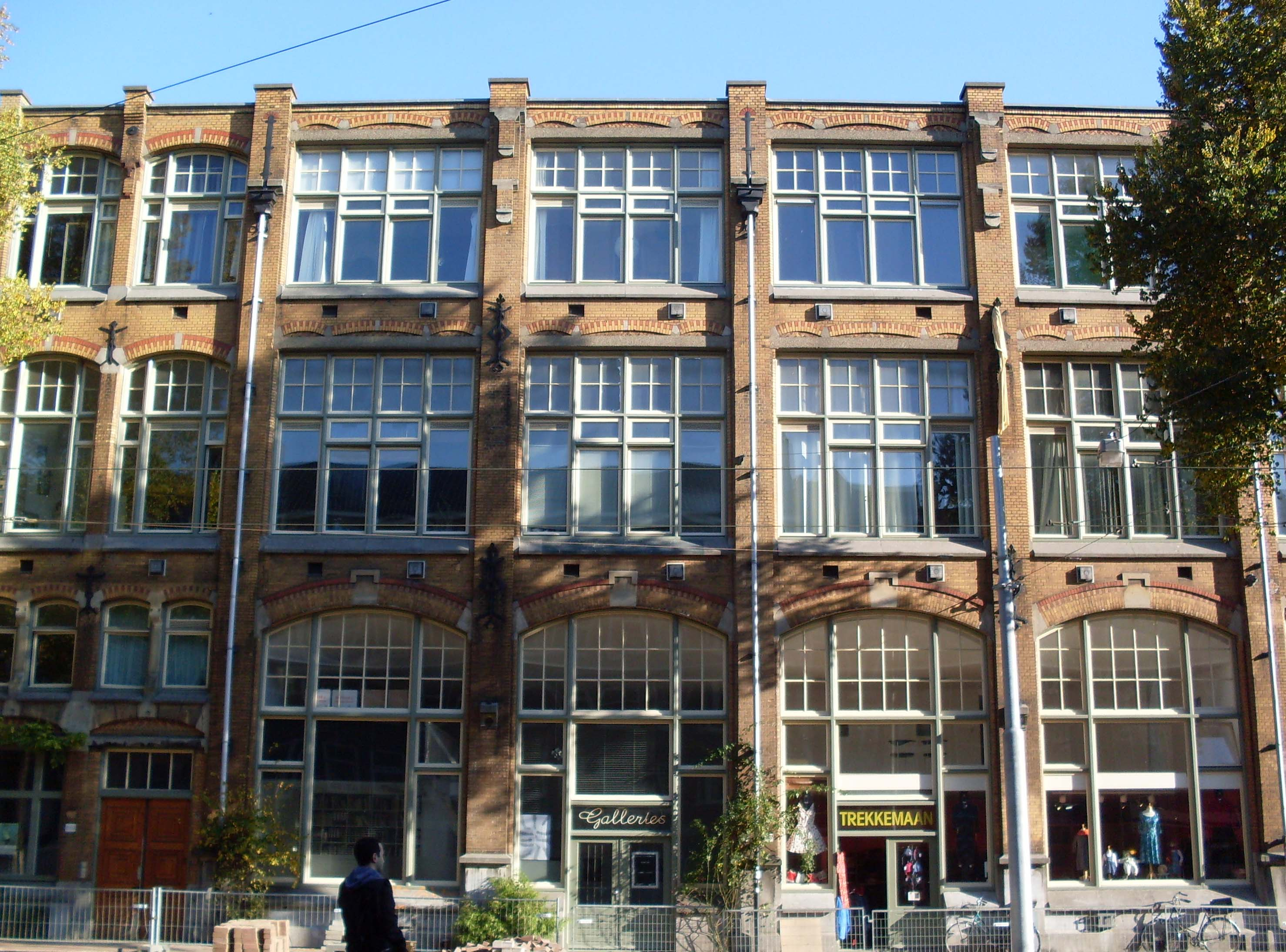
Bilderdijkstraat 163 in 2010

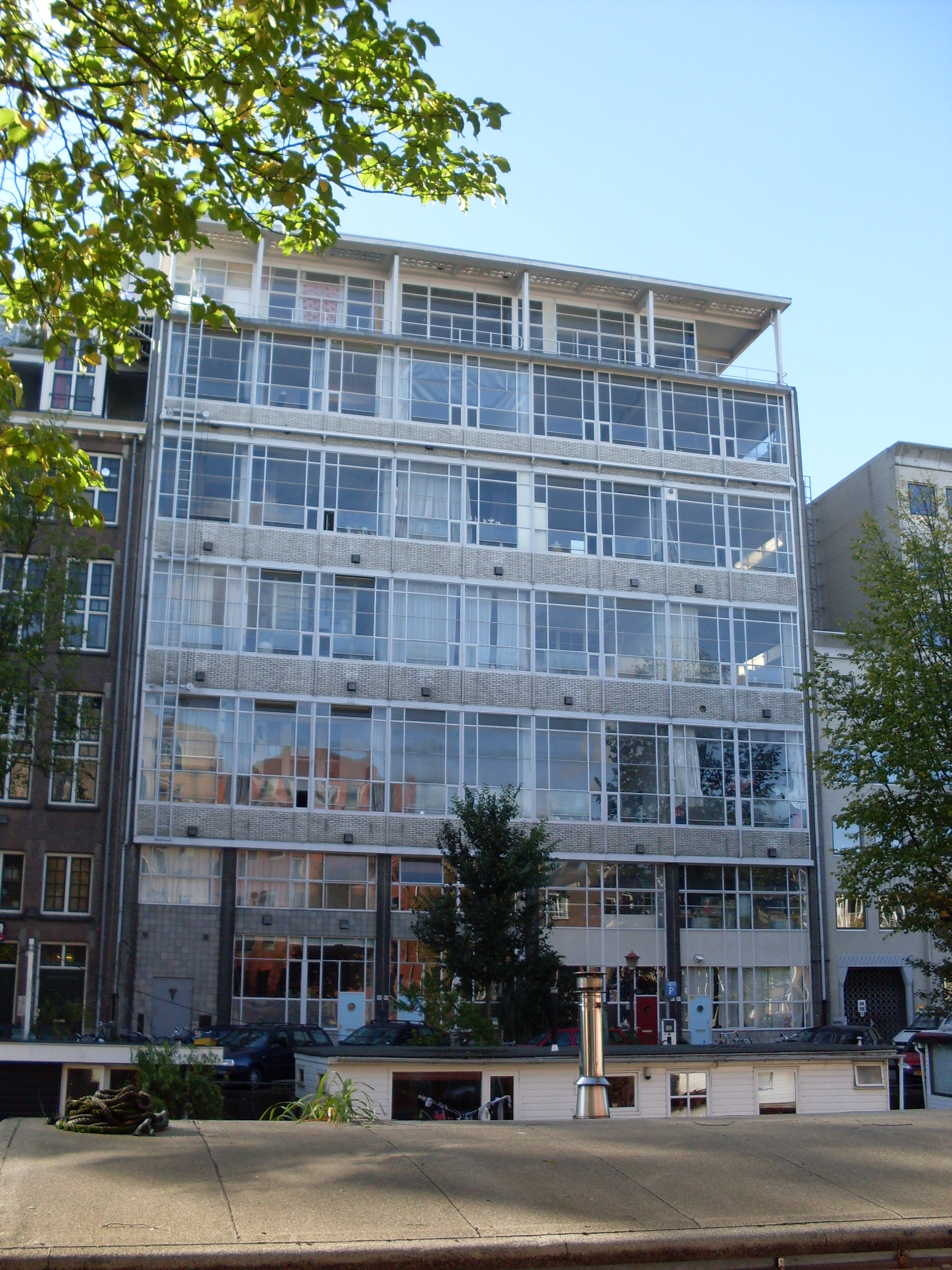
Da Costakade 148 in 2010

The Amsterdam Type Foundry (Dutch: Lettergieterij Amsterdam) was built in 1902 for the Tetterode print company at 163–167 Bilderdijkstraat, by the architect J.W.F. Hartkamp in the style of Art Nouveau. The same architect constructed another building at 158–164 Da Costakade in 1912 and redeveloped a former dairy at 157A-161 Bilderdijkstraat between 1920 and 1921. A new building was begun on 148–156 Da Costakade by J.F. van Erven Dorens in 1940 and finished by B. Merkelbach, C. Karsten and P. Elling in 1951, in the style of Nieuwe Zakelijkheid.

== Occupation ==
The complex of four large buildings was left derelict in 1981, when Tetterode moved its headquarters to the Willem de Zwijgerlaan. Developers made plans to demolish them and construct luxury apartments; in protest, squatters occupied the complex on 17 October 1981. The occupation became a self-managed social centre both for the squatters movement and the local community, nicknamed De Rode Tetter (The Red Tetter). Over winter, the buildings were very cold and had rats, so the squatters heated with gas canisters, built rooms and cleared out the old industrial machines. A nightclub began in the basement called Flux; by 1985 it had become De Trut (The Bitch), a gay and lesbian disco which took place every Sunday.

== Legalization ==
In 1986, the occupation was legalized when the city bought the building. The squatters formed a cooperative, becoming tenants; under the casco ("hull") contract they are responsible for developing the inside of the buildings and the housing corporation Het Oosten (now Stadgenoot) is responsible for the upkeep of the outside of the building. Regarding rent, the corporation agreed to charge the tenants no more than it spent on renovating the buildings. This contract was later challenged by a tenant, who lived at Tetterode from 1990 onwards. He alleged that Stadgenoot had charged 1.1 million euros more than they should have done; when an independent committee led by a professor from Delft University of Technology assessed the situation in 2016, it decided that Stadgenoot had overcharged the rent, but by a lesser amount of 500,000 euros. The tenant was critical of the Tetterode residents association and in 2018 was warned by a judge to stop making comments. He continued to do so and was evicted in 2020.

As of 2008, projects using the Tetterode complex included an art gallery, arts and crafts workshops, a clothes shop, a citizens advice centre, De Trut, a hairdresser, a kindergarten (called De Tettertjes), a printer, a shoemaker and a theatre. In 2021, the Tetterode live/work complex celebrated its fortieth anniversary and participants held an exhibition at De Hallen. Projects using the complex included an art gallery, the Eddie the Eagle museum, a hairdresser, a shoemaker, stencil printers and De Trut. At that time, around 150 people lived in the buildings; a book entitled Zeggenschap zonder bezit (Control without possession) was published both recording the collective history and proposing that live/work buildings could be a useful model for improving Dutch cities.

== Selected works ==
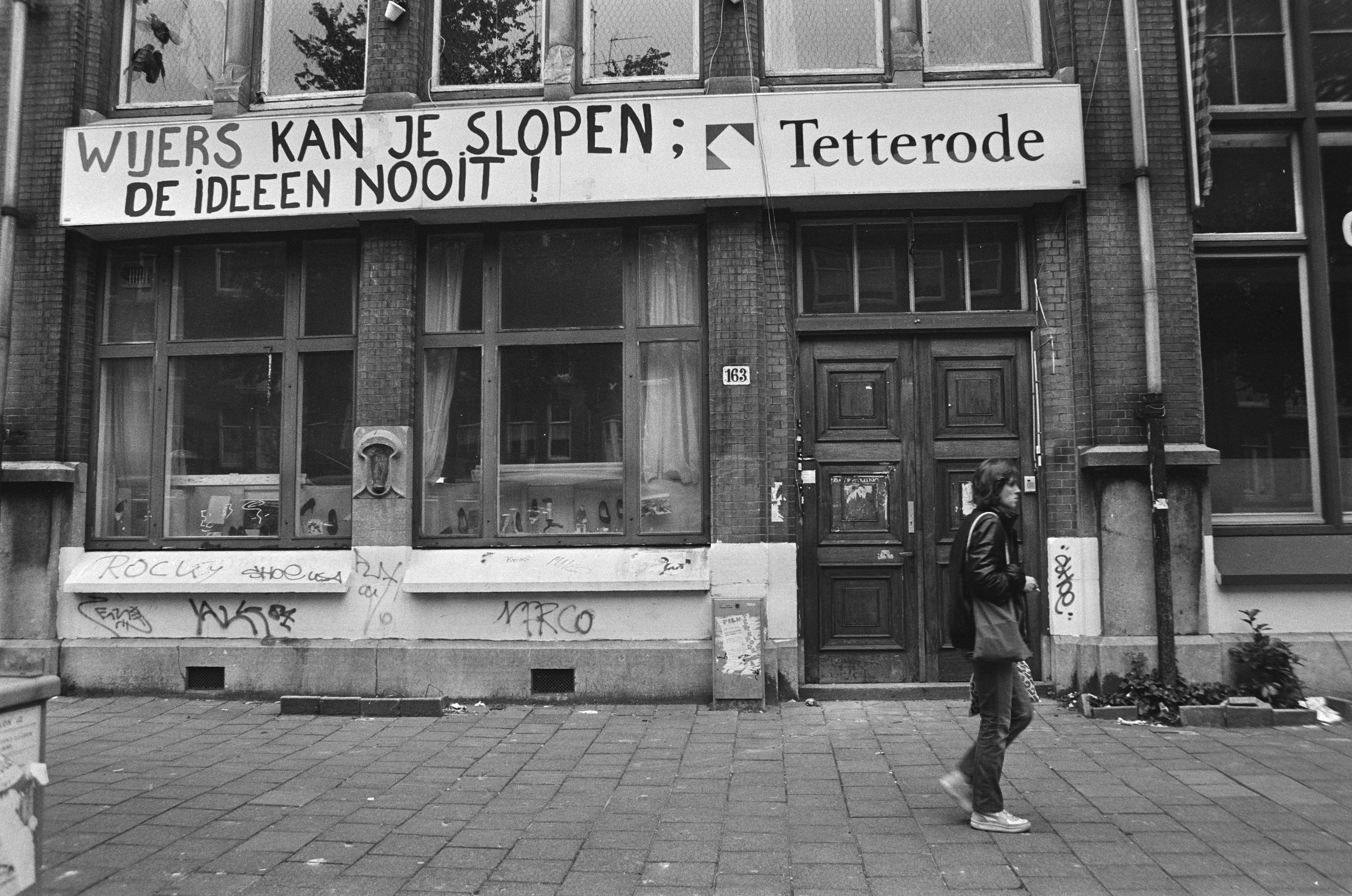
Tetterode in 1984 with a banner supporting the Wyers squat

- Various authors (2020) Zeggenschap zonder bezit (Control without possession)
- Nuis, Ad (2011) 30 jaar Tetterode (Thirty years of Tetterode)
- Various authors (2000) Thuis in Tetterode (At home at Tetterode)
- Sep, Peter (1999) Tetterode complex: Van kraakaffair tot volkshuisvestingsmodel (Tetterode complex: From squat to public housing model)
- Various authors (1991) Tetter Ode
