= Amsterdam Type Foundry =

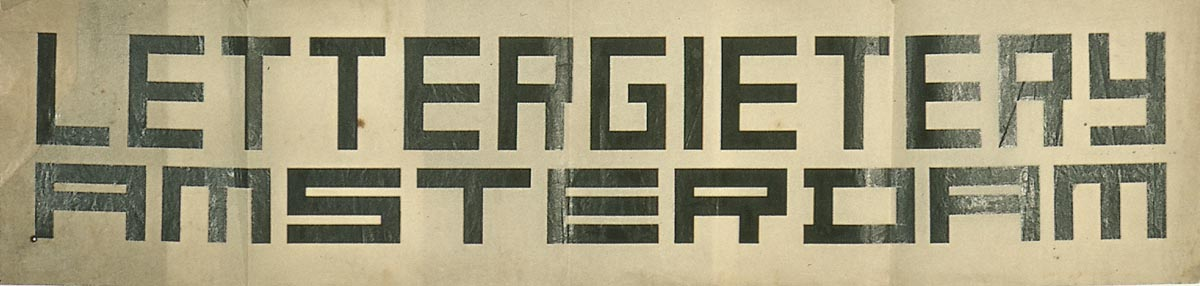
- Native name: Lettergieterij Amsterdam
- Industry: Type foundry
- Founded: 1851
- Founder: Nicolaas Tetterode
- Headquarters: Amsterdam, Netherlands

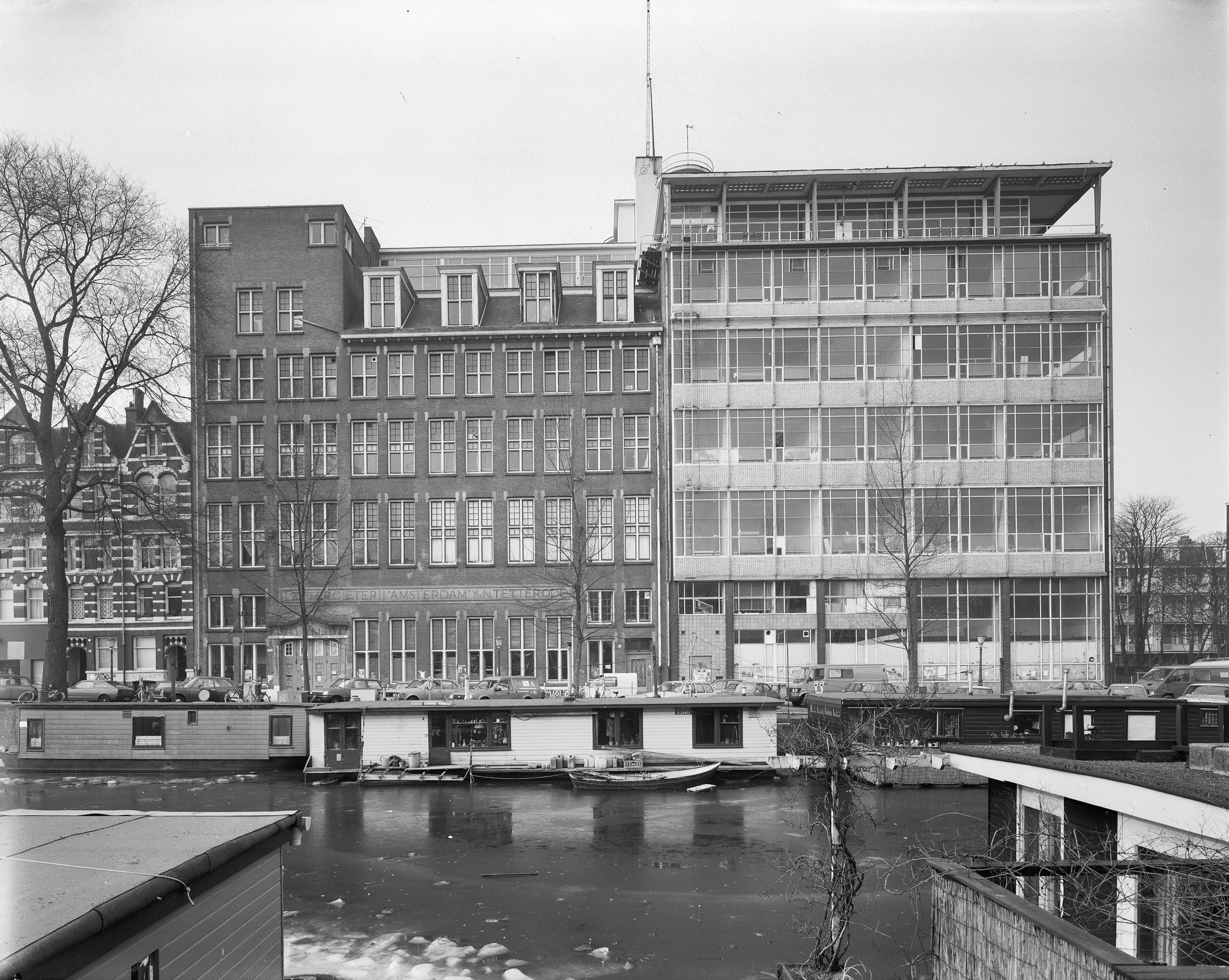
Former buildings of the type foundry in Amsterdam

The Amsterdam Type Foundry (Dutch: Lettergieterij Amsterdam) was a type foundry based in Amsterdam, Netherlands.

== History ==
The type foundry was established by Nicolaas Tetterode in 1851.

It contributed a number of original type designs early in the 20th century, some of which were designed by S. H. de Roos and Dick Dooijes.

In the 20th century, only two major typefoundries survived in the Netherlands. In Haarlem, the old typefoundry of Joh. Enschedé was their competitor. In order to divide the market, these firms kept a certain difference in type-height. Amsterdam: 66 + 1/24 point Didot, and Enschedé: 66 - 1/24 point Didot. Enough to prevent the combined use of their type.

Eventually, it became a division of Tetterode. On October 1, 2000, Tetterode transferred the rights for all of its typefaces to Linotype.

== Typefaces ==
=== Foundry Type ===
These foundry types were produced by the Type foundry Amsterdam:

- Aigrette, script
  - initials
- Arsis
- Atlas
  - light
  - normal
  - bold
- Bristol (1929).
- Bodoni light
- Bodoni
  - Bodoni semi bold
  - Bodoni Bold
- Carlton (1929), an in-line version of Bristol.
- Choc (1964, Roger Excoffon) originally released by Fonderie Olive in 1955.
- Columbia, originally cast in 1904 as Kolonial by the Woellmer Type Foundry, also cast as Buffalo by the H.C. Hansen Type Foundry of Boston.
- Contura (1966, Dick Dooijes)
- De Roos (1947, S.H. de Roos).
  - De Roos roman
  - De Roos italic
  - De Roos initials
- Egmont (1933, S.H. de Roos), later copied by Intertype (1937).
  - Egmont
  - Egmont light roman & italic
  - Egmont bold
  - Egmont inline capitals
- Egyptian Bold, a nineteenth century design.
- Erasmus mediaeval
  - Erasmus mediaeval roman
  - Erasmus mediaeval italic
  - Erasmus mediaeval initials (2 series)
- Excelsior, script
  - normal
  - light
  - semi bold
- Garamont, based on the ATF design of 1917.
- Gracia, script
- Gravure (1912), a copy of G. Peignot et Fils' Moreau-le-Jeune.
  - series 1
  - series 2
  - Gravure open
  - Gravure decorative italic capitals
- Grotesque
  - condensed light
  - condensed
  - bold
  - small bold
  - card grotesque caps light
  - card grotesque caps bold
- Grotius
- Hermes (1924), a tooled version of Caslon.
- Hidalgo (1939, Stefan Schlesinger.
- Hollandsche Mediaeval
  - Hollandsche Mediaeval roman
  - Hollandsche Mediaeval italic
  - Hollandsche Mediaeval semi bold
  - Hollandsche Mediaeval ornamented initials & initialen
- Ideal
- Iris
- Impressum (1962, Baum + Bauer), originally cut for Stempel Type Foundry.
- Juno
- Libra, S.H. de Roos
  - normal
  - light
- Nobel
  - light
  - bold
  - condensed
  - condensed bold
  - small capitals
  - small capitals light
  - inline capitals
- Old Dutch
- Pressa, originally cut by Intertype as Ideal News.
- Romaans (Riegerl Weissenborn), based upon Schelter & Giesecke's Romanisch and later copied as Intertype's Lormier.
- Reiner script
- Rondo, script
  - normal
  - bold
- Savoy
- Simplex
  - normal
  - semi bold
- Studio
- Typewriter
- Visite

=== Cold Type ===
These designs were produced by the Type foundry Amsterdam for photocomposition:

- Adonis (1971, Andrea Cretton), later cast in metal by Stephenson Blake.
