= Fonderie Olive =

French type foundry

- Industry: Type foundry
- Founded: 1836
- Defunct: 1978
- Headquarters: Marseille, France
- Key people: Roger Excoffon

The Fonderie Olive, in English, Olive Foundry, was a small but high-profile type foundry located in Marseille, France. It is best known for the work of the typeface designer Roger Excoffon, hired by the foundry’s last director, Marcel Olive. In 1978 the foundry was acquired by the Mergenthaler Linotype Company which transferred photocomposition rights for all faces to Haas.

== Typefaces ==
These foundry types were produced by Fonderie Olive:

- Antique Olive (1962-1966, Roger Excoffon)
- Banco (1951, Roger Excoffon)
- Calypso (1958, Roger Excoffon)
- Chambord (1945-51, Roger Excoffon)
- Choc (1955, Roger Excoffon), also released by Amsterdam Type foundry in 1964.
- Diane (1956, Roger Excoffon)
- Mistral (1953, Roger Excoffon), also released by Amsterdam Type foundry in 1955.
- Vendôme (1954, François Ganeau), also released by Bauer Type foundry in 1962.
