= S. H. de Roos =

Dutch type designer, book cover designer, and artist (1877–1962)

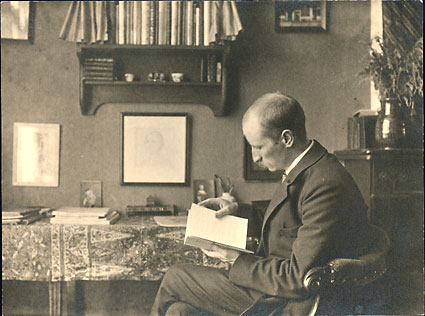
- S. H. de Roos (1910)
- Born: Sjoerd Hendrik de Roos; 14 September 1877; Drachten, Netherlands
- Died: 3 April 1962 (aged 84); Haarlem, Netherlands
- Education: Rijksakademie

Sjoerd Hendrik de Roos (14 September 1877 – 3 April 1962), better known as S. H. de Roos, was a Dutch type designer, book cover designer and artist.

== Life and work ==
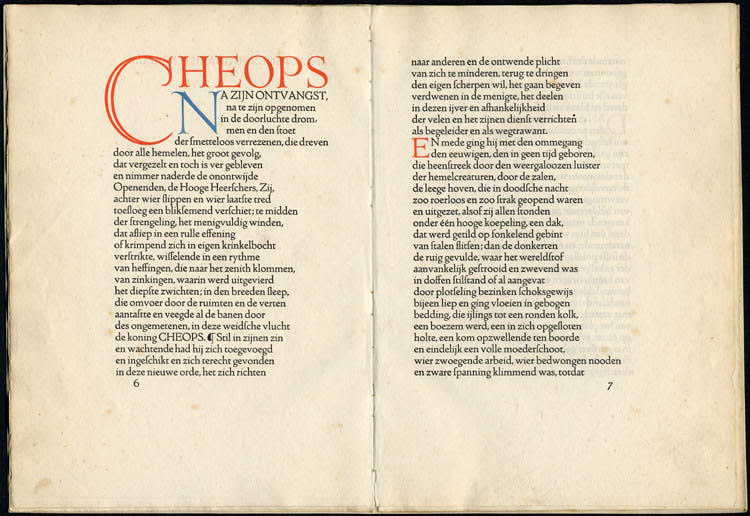
The letters of Cheops (1916) were designed by De Roos.

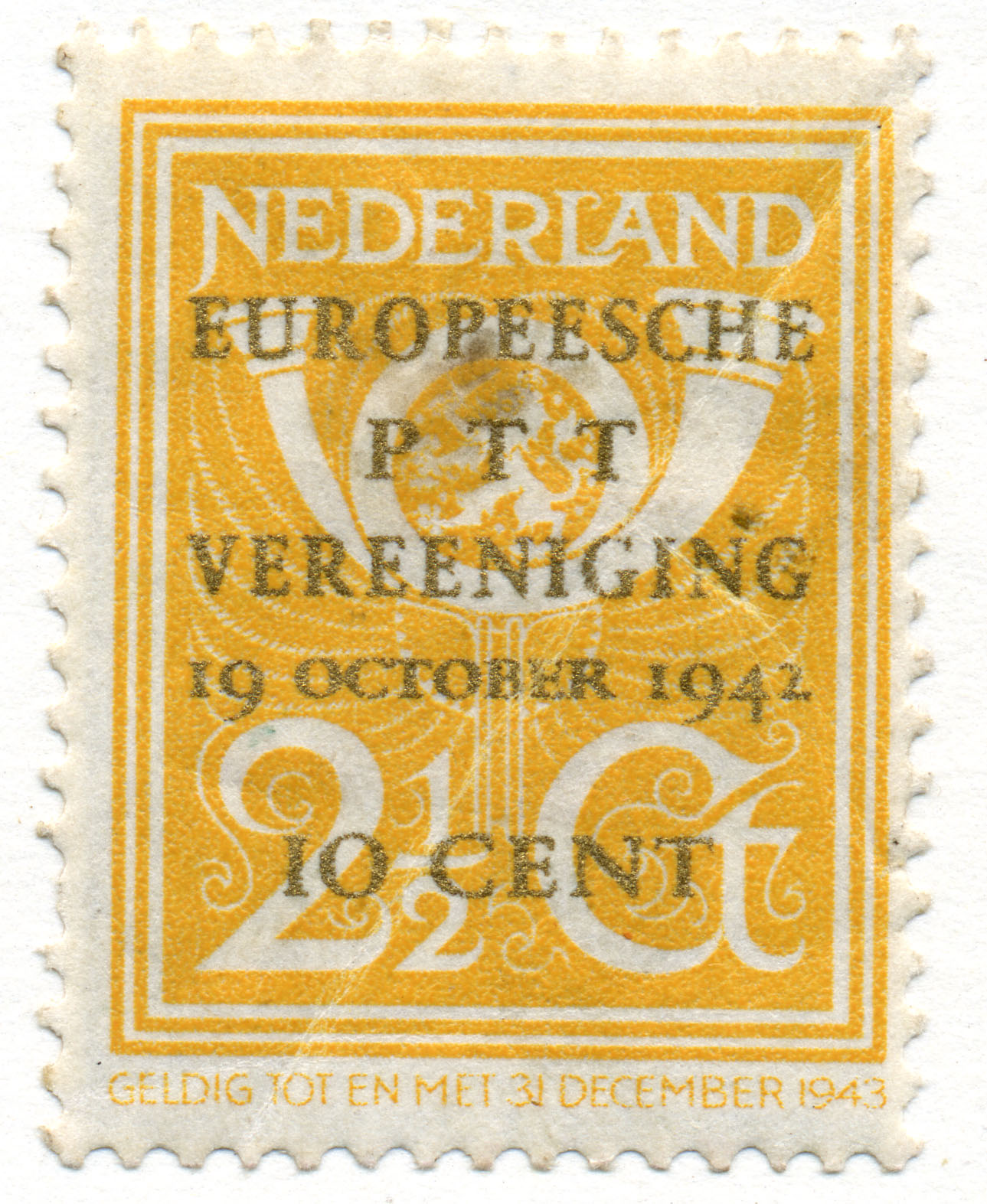
Stamp from 1943 designed by De Roos

De Roos was born in Drachten to a cobbler, but moved to Amsterdam at an early age. It was here that, between the ages of twelve and fourteen, he trained to be a lithographer. Later he studied at the Teekenschool voor Kunstambachten (The School of Drawing for the Arts and Crafts), part of the Rijksakademie.

In his early years De Roos was inspired by the Arts and Crafts Movement. An example of this can be found in his edition of Kunst en Maatschappij (Art and Society (1903)). As a supporter of Ferdinand Domela Nieuwenhuis, De Roos attempted to create the ideal of ‘Art to the People’.

Between 1907 and 1941 he was employed by the Amsterdam Type foundry (known previously as N. Tetterode), where he further developed his lithographic skills. During this period he designed, a new type face, the Hollandsche Mediæval, the first Dutch made typeface for 150 years. In total De Roos designed twelve type faces, the most successful being the Hollandsche mediæval, the Egmont, the Libra and the De Roos Roman and Italic.

Archive material, as well as the Tetterode Collection both attributed to De Roos, are available at the Library of the University of Amsterdam. Further archives are available at the City Library of Haarlem, the Rijksmuseum Amsterdam, the Frans Hals Museum in Haarlem and the Museum Smallingerland in Drachten.

=== Typefaces ===
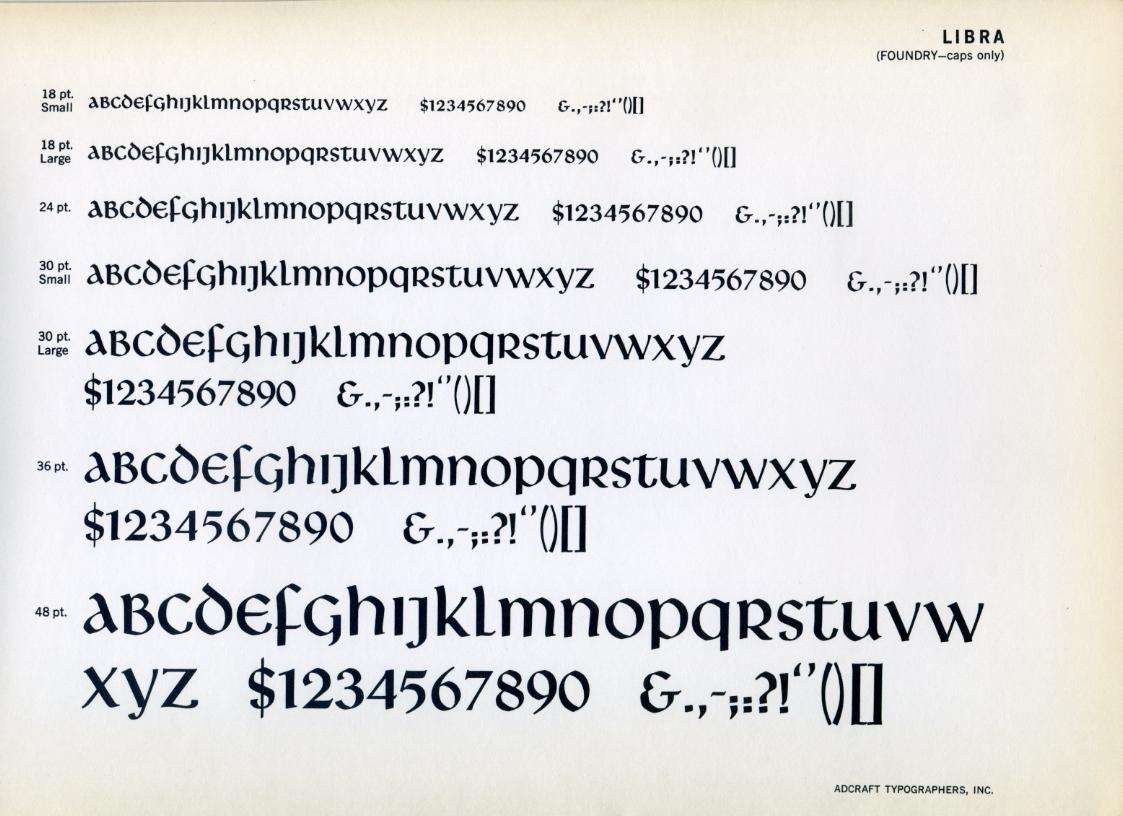
Typeface specimen of Libra Uncial

- Nieuw Javaansch No. 1 (1909)
- Hollandse Mediaeval (1912)
- Zilvertype (1914–1916, with Jean-François van Royen)
- Ella Cursief (1916)
- Erasmus Mediaeval (c. 1923)
- Meidoorn (1928)
- Nobel (1929)
- Egmont (1933)
- Simplex (1937)
- Libra Uncial (1938)
- De Roos Romein/Cursief (1947)
- De Roos Inline
