= Mistral (typeface) =

- Category: Script
- Classification: Casual script
- Designer: Roger Excoffon
- Foundry: Fonderie Olive
- Date released: 1953
- Re-issuing foundries: Amsterdam Type Foundry
- Variations: Staccato 222

Mistral is a casual script typeface designed by Roger Excoffon for the Fonderie Olive type foundry, and released in 1953. The Amsterdam Type foundry released a version in 1955.

Excoffon based the form of the typeface on his own handwriting. The stroke has an informal graphic quality similar to brush and ink. The lowercase letters are carefully designed to connect on a line to an extent unusual in script fonts. Descenders are long, and increase the sense of motion. The face has several specially designed ligatures (which have not been duplicated in digital versions). In lowercase Mistral is a true connecting script, similar to cursive writing.

Choc, another typeface of Excoffon's, grew out of his repeated and ultimately abandoned efforts to make a bold of Mistral.

The poster for the film Drive uses this font for the film's title.

== Bibliography ==
- Fiedl, Frederich, Nicholas Ott and Bernard Stein. Typography: An Encyclopedic Survey of Type Design and Techniques Through History. Black Dog & Leventhal: 1998. ISBN 1-57912-023-7.
- Jaspert, W. Pincus, W. Turner Berry and A.F. Johnson. The Encyclopedia of Type Faces. Blandford Press Lts.: 1953, 1983. ISBN 0-7137-1347-X.
- Macmillan, Neil. An A–Z of Type Designers. Yale University Press: 2006. ISBN 0-300-11151-7.
