= Jones Knowles Ritchie =

British design agency

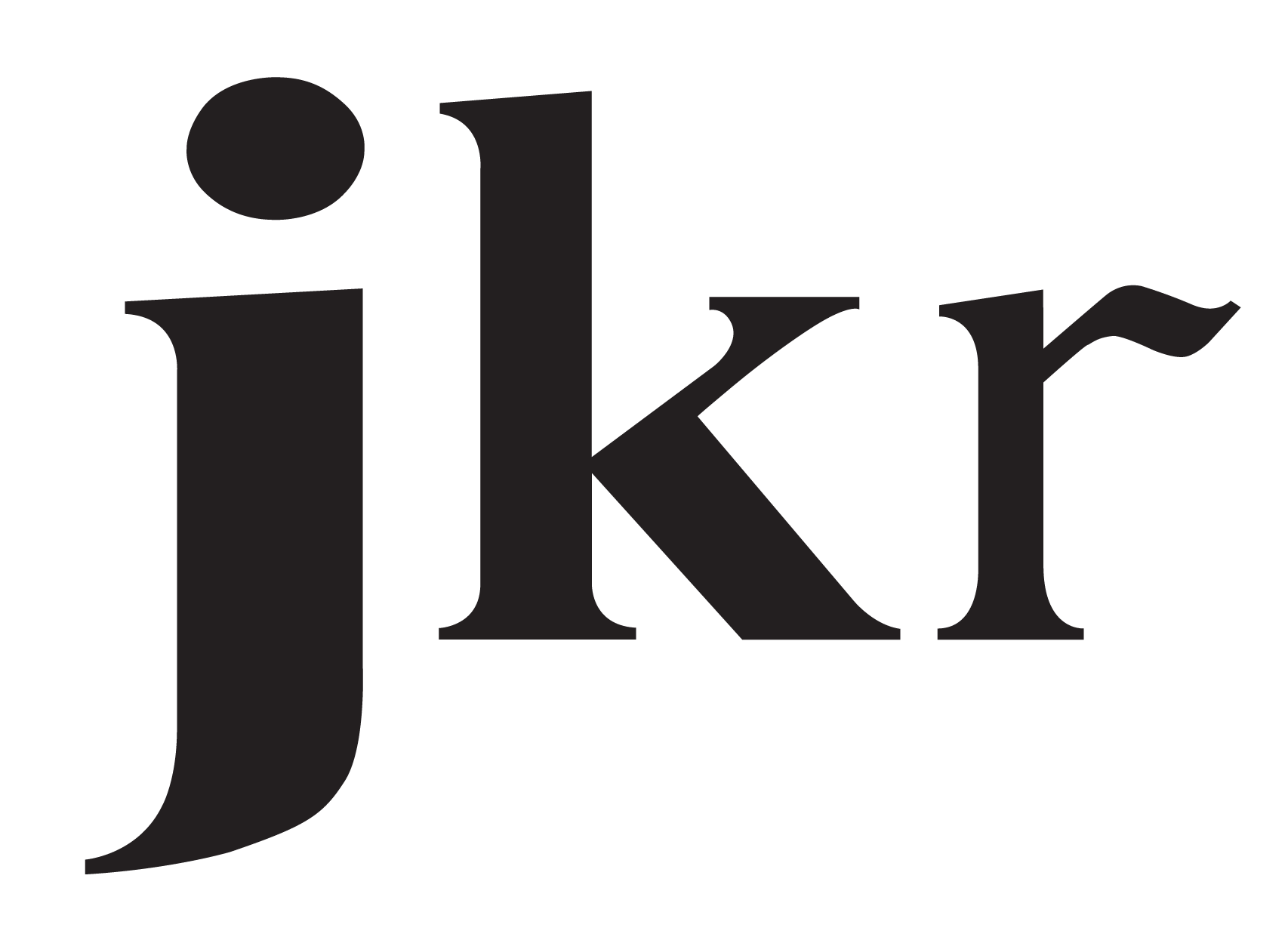
- Industry: Marketing
- Founded: 1990; 36 years ago in London
- Founders: Joe Jones, Andrew Knowles, Ian Ritchie
- Website: www.jkrglobal.com

Jones Knowles Ritchie (JKR) is a creative agency based in London, New York, and Shanghai. JKR was established in London by designers Joe Jones, Andy Knowles, and Ian Ritchie.
