= Sky City (store) =

American discount retail chain

- Industry: Discount stores
- Predecessor: Bowers department stores (founded 1919, Knoxville, Tennessee)
- Founded: August 15, 1962; 62 years ago in Asheville, North Carolina, United States
- Founder: M.C. Peterson
- Defunct: January 1991
- Fate: Closed
- Headquarters: Asheville, North Carolina, United States
- Area served: United States
- Key people: John B. Owens (director of stores and operations)
- Owner: Consortium including Harvey Yellen
- Number of employees: 1000 (1991)

Sky City was a regional chain of discount stores, based in Asheville, North Carolina. The store's name was a reference to the "Land of the Sky," a nickname for the city of Asheville that was popularized in the 20th century.

Sky City was founded in 1962 by retail executive M.C. Peterson as an evolution of Bowers department stores, a regional chain founded in 1919 in Knoxville, Tennessee. Peterson became president of Bowers stores in 1948 and relocated its headquarters to Asheville that same year. Peterson's concept for the first Sky City store was to provide a suburban alternative to the urban department store experience by selling discounted name-brand merchandise in a self-service, multi-department store that offered plentiful free parking. The concept was so popular with Asheville shoppers that, by 1963, Peterson had to double the size of Sky City's Asheville flagship store. In 1964, a second location was opened in Hickory, and a third location was opened in High Point in 1965.

In 1977, Sky City merged with Interco, Inc. of St. Louis, Missouri, but remained an autonomous operating entity with its headquarters in Asheville. By 1982, the chain spanned five Southeastern states with more than 70 locations. However, by the late 1980s, the retailer began to falter. Parent company Interco, Inc. had taken on debts from fighting a hostile takeover bid in 1988. Also, despite generating sales of $140 million in 1990–up from $120 million the previous year–the retailer faced heated competition in the Southeast trading area from discount retailer Wal-Mart, which first entered Sky City's home base of North Carolina in the late 1980s, as well as Rose's Department Store and Kmart stores.

In 1990, 20 of the chain's 55 Southeastern stores were shuttered as part of a restructuring of Sky City operations. Remaining stores in North Carolina, South Carolina, Tennessee, Georgia and Virginia underwent a remodeling and a program to beef up in-store inventory levels. The shuttered locations included nine stores in North Carolina, five stores each in Georgia and South Carolina, and one in Tennessee. Employees at these shuttered locations were relocated to the remaining stores whenever possible. At the time, Harvey Yellen, Sky City Stores' chief executive officer, noted that it was possible that some of the closed stores could be reopened at a later date.

In 1991, Interco, Inc. sold Sky City Stores, Inc. to a group of investors, headed by Yellen, for an undisclosed figure. The investment group formed a new company, Sky City Holding Corp. The new company included a Hong Kong–based global trading firm called Asia Pacific Industries. The infusion of capital from Asia Pacific Industries and other members of the holding company allowed for five new store openings in 1991–each conforming to the chain's new, 30,000-square-foot (2,800 m^{2}) prototype size–plus the development of new corporate offices, a warehouse, and a distribution center in Asheville.

John B. Owens, director of stores and operations with Sky City, said the 30,000-square-foot (2,800 m^{2}) prototype was designed to serve small communities. Stores typically ranged in size from 51,000 square feet (4,700 m^{2}) to 28,000 square feet (2,600 m^{2}). Also, Owens said the chain planned to increase the percentage of merchandise that resulted from opportunistic buys to better compete with retailers like Wal-Mart. Sky City was set to open its first test prototype in March 1991.

However, in January 1991, Yellen abruptly announced that all remaining Sky City stores had closed. Approximately 1,000 employees were affected, with some being rehired by liquidation firms to catalog and remove merchandise from store locations.
