= Roger Excoffon =

French typographer

Roger Excoffon (7 September 1910 – 30 May 1983) was a French typeface designer and graphic designer.

Excoffon was born in Marseille, studied law at the University of Aix-en-Provence, and then moved to Paris to apprentice in a print shop. In 1947, he formed his own advertising agency and concurrently became design director of a small foundry in Marseille called Fonderie Olive. Later, he co-founded the prestigious Studio U+O, named in reference to "Urbi et Orbi".

Mistral typeface

Excoffon's best-known faces are Mistral and Antique Olive, the latter which he designed between 1962 and 1966. Air France, one of Excoffon's largest and most prestigious clients, used a customized variant of Antique Olive in its wordmark and livery until 2009, when a new logo was introduced.

Excoffon's faces, even the sober Antique Olive, have an organic vibrancy not found in similar sans-serif types of the period. His typefaces gave voice to an exuberant body of contemporary French and European graphic design.

He is a founding member of L’Académie nationale des arts de la rue (ANAR) created in 1975 with Jacques Dauphin, Maurice Cazeneuve, Paul Delouvrier, Georges Elgozy, Abraham Moles, and André Parinaud.

== Typefaces ==
These typefaces were designed by Roger Excoffon:

- Chambord (typeface) (1945-51, Fonderie Olive)
- Banco (1951, Fonderie Olive)
- Mistral (1953, Fonderie Olive), also released by Amsterdam Type foundry in 1955.
- Choc (1955, Fonderie Olive), also released by Amsterdam Type foundry in 1964.
- Diane (typeface) (1956, Fonderie Olive)
- Calypso (typeface) (1958, Fonderie Olive)
- Antique Olive (1962-1966, Fonderie Olive)
Antique Olive

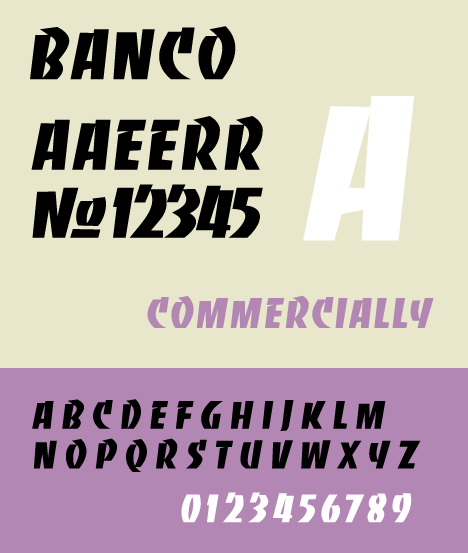
Banco

Calypso

Choc

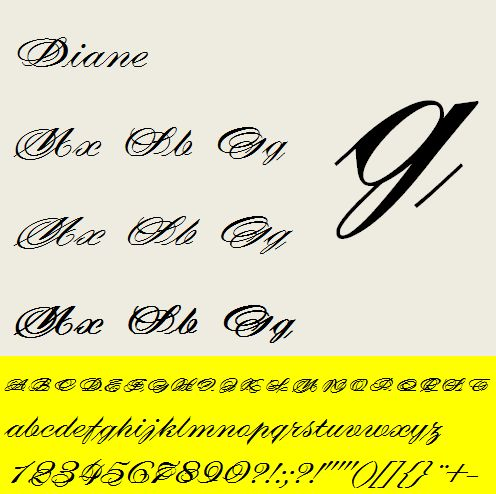
Diane

Mistral
