= Choc (typeface) =

1955 typeface by Roger Excoffon

- Designer(s): Roger Excoffon
- Date created: 1955
- Design based on: Mistral
- Also known as: Staccato 555

Choc (French: "shock") is a display script typeface designed by Roger Excoffon in 1955.

The typeface grew out of Excoffon's repeated and ultimately abandoned efforts to make a bold of his typeface Mistral. In the 1980s, the prevailing opinion among designers was that, because of its lack of modernity, it was one of Excoffon's "tacky fonts that should only have been used for parodying the shop window of a provincial butcher, baker or hair salon".

In the 1990s, Choc was distributed digitally with the graphics software CorelDraw under the name Staccato 555. CorelDraw's widespread use in signmaking shops may have helped Choc in becoming widely used in signage. Because the letterforms evoke the forms of East Asian calligraphy (whether intentionally or not is unclear), Choc is especially often used in signs for Asian businesses. The New York Times wrote in 2018 that "Choc has become a typographical shorthand for Asian-themed restaurants" in New York City, where it is frequently seen.
