= Univers =

Neo-grotesque sans-serif typeface

- Category: Sans-serif
- Classification: Neo-grotesque
- Designer: Adrian Frutiger
- Foundry: Deberny & Peignot
- Date released: 1957
- Re-issuing foundries: Monotype; Linotype

Univers (French pronunciation: [ynivɛʁ]) is a sans-serif typeface family designed by Adrian Frutiger and released by his employer Deberny & Peignot in 1957. Classified as a neo-grotesque sans-serif, one based on the model of nineteenth-century German typefaces such as Akzidenz-Grotesk, it was notable for its availability from the moment of its launch in a comprehensive range of weights and widths. The original marketing for Univers deliberately referenced the periodic table to emphasise its scope.

Univers was one of the first typeface families to fulfil the idea that a typeface should form a family of consistent, related designs. Past sans-serif designs such as Gill Sans had much greater differences between weights, while loose families such as American Type Founders' Franklin Gothic family often were advertised under different names for each style, to emphasise that they were not completely matching. By creating a matched range of styles and weights, Univers allowed documents to be created in one consistent typeface for all text, making it easier to artistically set documents in sans-serif type. This matched the desire among practitioners of the "Swiss style" of typography for neutral sans-serif typefaces avoiding artistic excesses.

The design concept of Univers was intended to take advantage of the new technology of phototypesetting, in which fonts were stored as glass discs rather than as solid metal type and matrices for every size to be used. Deberny & Peignot had established itself as a leader in this technology, although as by the time of its launch metal type was still very popular, the design was also released in this form. Univers was rapidly licensed and re-released by Monotype, Linotype, American Type Founders, IBM and others for phototypesetting, for metal type and reproduction by typewriter. Historian James Mosley has described it as "probably the last major" release of a large family as metal type.

== Characteristics ==
Rémy Peignot's Univers graphic emphasised the family's scope through referencing the periodic table.

Some of these old sans serifs have had a real renaissance within the last twenty years, once the reaction of the 'New Objectivity' had been overcome. A purely geometrical form of type is unsustainable.

— Frutiger in 1961, explaining why his design had rejected the geometric sans-serif design trend popular from the 1920s to the 1950s.

Univers is one of a group of neo-grotesque sans-serif typefaces, all released for phototypesetting in 1957, and as foundry type in 1958, that includes Folio and Neue Haas Grotesk (later renamed Helvetica). As all are based on Akzidenz-Grotesk, these three faces are sometimes confused with each other. These typefaces figure prominently in the Swiss Style of graphic design.

Univers was released after a long period in which geometric typefaces such as Futura had been popular. Frutiger disliked purely geometric designs, finding them too rigid, following a common school of thought among Swiss designers of the period. While studying at the Kunstgewerbeschule (Arts and Crafts School) in Zürich, he had begun to sketch a revived grotesque family based on 19th-century grotesques, at the time considered antiquated outside Switzerland. He described Univers in 1998 as having a 'visual sensitivity between thick and thin' strokes, avoiding perfect geometry.

Different weights and variations within the type family are designated by the use of numbers rather than names, a system since adopted by Frutiger for other type designs. Frutiger envisioned a large family with multiple widths and weights that maintained a unified design idiom. However, the actual typeface names within Univers family include both number and letter suffixes. The design, with a working title of Monde, was developed from 1953 to a final release in 1957.

Like most grotesque and neo-grotesque sans-serifs, Univers's slanted form is an oblique, in which the letterforms are slanted, with minor corrections but no other major alterations. This is different from a true italic, in which the letterforms become modified to resemble handwriting more. In the original design, Frutiger chose obliques with the extremely aggressive slant of sixteen degrees, which was reduced to twelve in some later releases. Linotype Univers (below) returns to the original angle.

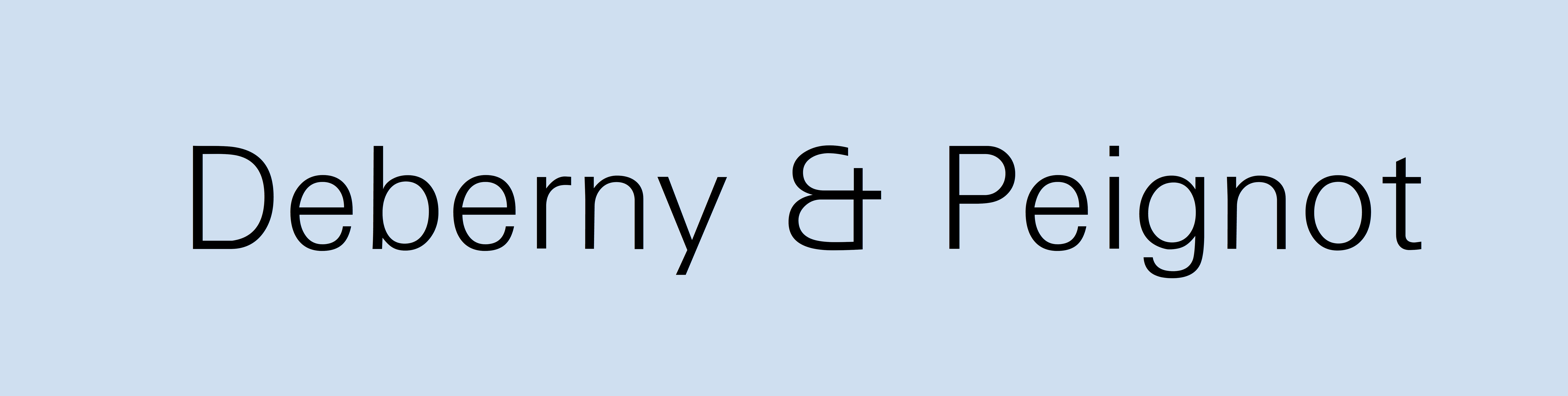
Univers' ampersand is a distinctive 'et' ligature of a style popular in French-speaking countries.

Frutiger's original ampersand was a true 'et' ligature, similar to that in Trebuchet among others. Frutiger later provided an alternative for non French-speaking countries in which the form might be less familiar.

The Deberny & Peignot library was acquired in 1972 by Haas Type Foundry. It was transferred into the D. Stempel AG and Linotype collection in 1985 and 1989 respectively upon the Haas'sche Schriftgiesserei's acquisition and closure; it is now owned by Monotype following its purchase of Linotype in 2007. An independent version of Univers was licensed by the Berthold Type Foundry for its phototypesetting system with adaptations by Günter Gerhard Lange; Frutiger wrote in his autobiography that he had some affection for it.

== Comparison with Akzidenz-Grotesk, Folio, and Helvetica ==
Comparison of distinguishing characters in Akzidenz-Grotesk, Folio, Helvetica, and Univers 55

Univers is similar in design to other European grotesque fonts, of which Akzidenz-Grotesk, Folio, and Helvetica are among the most common. Differences include:

- The tail of 'a' and the top of '1' are much less rounded.
- Upper-case 'G' is formed without an arrow head (called a spur).
- Both arms of 'K' join at the stem.
- The tail of 'Q' runs along the baseline.
- The tail of 'R' is curved (compared with Akzidenz-Grotesk).
- The top of 't' is angled.
- The dot of the 'i' is not square but a rectangle.
- Lower-case 'y' has a straight descender.
- Many of the numerals in Univers have straight vs. curved ascenders
- Helvetica tends to have a slightly greater x-height than Univers
- Univers generally has quite a wide spacing between letters, and its low x-height gives it a more low-slung, splayed appearance than Helvetica, especially in bold.

Frutiger himself has commented: "Helvetica is the jeans, and Univers the dinner jacket." Walter Tracy described it as better proportioned for text than Helvetica: "more original and subtle in its modelling than Helvetica and, because its character spacing was properly done, a better performer in text composition." Mosley has described its even design as "rather bland" and noted that Monotype's eccentric, chaotically organised Grotesque family remained popular with more "iconoclastic" printers in the 1960s. Stephen Coles describes Univers as "in some ways, even more spare [than Helvetica] (no beards or tails)" and Simon Loxley comments that Helvetica "escapes the chilliness of Univers...it does have some elusive quality that gives it a friendlier feel". Dutch font designer Martin Majoor, while praising Univers for its "almost scientific" range of weights, criticised it for its lack of originality: "basing a sans serif on another is rather cheap." Frutiger's later landmark sans-serif designs, Avenir and Frutiger, would take very different, more geometric and humanist approaches.

== Usage ==
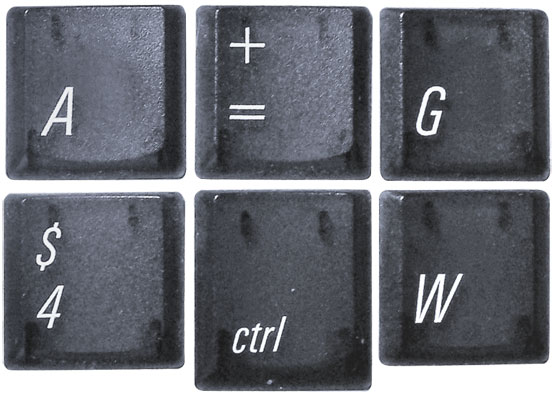
Keycaps featuring Univers from a pre-2003 PowerBook G4

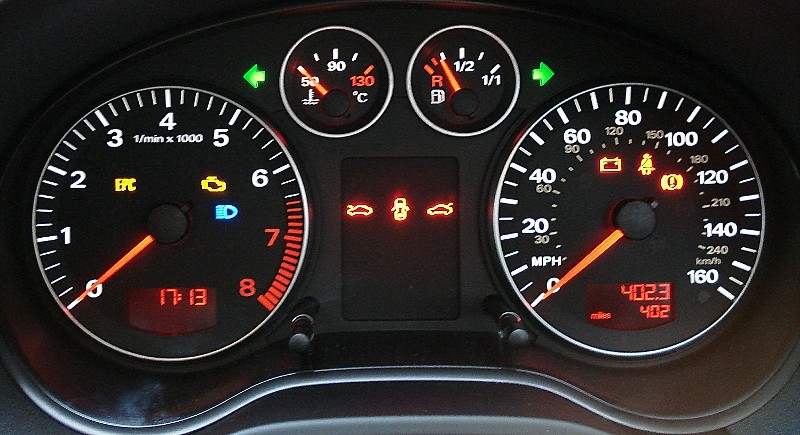
Audi Sans, a variation of Univers used in the dashboard graphics of an Audi A3 instrument panel

Univers enjoyed great popularity in the 1960s and 1970s because many corporations adopted it for usage. Apple Inc. previously used this typeface as well as its condensed oblique variant for the keycaps on many of its keyboards. Munich Re used a custom version of Univers until 2009.

Audi Sans is a variant based on Univers, designed by Ole Schäfer. It became Audi's corporate identity font in the 1990s when Audi contracted MetaDesign to support Audi's brand management strategy. The font was used extensively by Audi, appearing in sales literature, corporate communications, owners' documentation and even on the vehicles themselves in the instrument panel graphics and their MMI dashboard displays.

== The Frutiger numbering system ==
Frutiger designed his unique classification system to eliminate naming and specifying confusion. It was first used with Univers, and was adopted for use in the Frutiger, Avenir, and Neue Helvetica typeface families.

The number used in a font is a concatenation of two numbers. The first digit defines weight, while the second defines width and whether it is oblique or not.

Suffix
Number	1	2	3	4	5	6	7	8	9	10
Weight	-	Ultra Light	Thin	Light	Normal, Roman, or Regular	Medium	Bold	Heavy	Black	Ultra or Extra Black
Width and position	Ultra Extended	Ultra Extended Oblique	Extended	Extended Oblique	Normal	Oblique	Condensed	Condensed Oblique	Ultra Condensed	-

(note: oblique is not strict italic)

As an example, the number 56 denotes the normal weight (a first digit of 5) and an oblique style with the normal width (a second digit of 6).

Due to some typeface manufacturers’ failure to understand and implement the system correctly, however, things have actually become more confusing. To further complicate matters, the numbering system is not consistently applied to the Univers font family. In older publications, all oblique fonts have even-numbered 2nd values; but in digital versions, both odd and even 2nd values have been used on oblique fonts, but not in all font formats or weights. For example, Univers 55 Roman Oblique has both Windows menu names and PostScript full names as Univers LT 55 Oblique and Univers 56 Oblique, but only for the Windows PostScript version of the font; however, in Univers 85 Extra Black Oblique, there is no font named Univers 86 in any format. Nevertheless, oblique Univers fonts always have even-numbered 2nd value.

Inconsistent usage aside, the syntax of 2nd value is also inconsistent with 1st value. Bigger 1st value implies the glyph of a given character uses more horizontal space, but it has opposite meaning in 2nd value.

=== Linotype numbering system ===
In Linotype Univers and Univers Next font family, a 3-number system is used. First numeral describes font weight, second numeral describes font width, third numeral describes position.

Suffix
Number	0	1	2	3	4	5	6	7	8	9
Weight	-	Ultra Light	Thin	Light	Regular	Medium	Bold	Heavy	Black	Extra Black
Width	-	Compressed	Condensed	Basic	Extended	-	-	-	-	-
Position	Roman	Italic	-	-	-	-	-	-	-	-

Unlike the original Univers, tilted fonts in Linotype Univers and derivative font families have not been named 'oblique'.

== Releases ==
Versions of Univers have been released for almost every major typesetting system, including versions for a wide range of writing systems and with additional features such as schoolbook characters.

Although Univers was originally conceived to take advantage of the cost-saving properties of phototypesetting (Deberny & Peignot, hoping to leapfrog their competitors by taking full advantage of the new technology, advertised their Lumitype glass master discs as each replacing three tons of brass matrices), Deberny & Peignot arranged licensing deals with type foundries such as Monotype for wider release. Univers was quite successful in metal type, with several weights among Monotype's best-selling of all time despite being released at the very end of the metal type era, although Frutiger felt that the Monotype version, which some later versions copied, was limited by the antiquated Monotype technical system.

=== Pre-digital versions ===
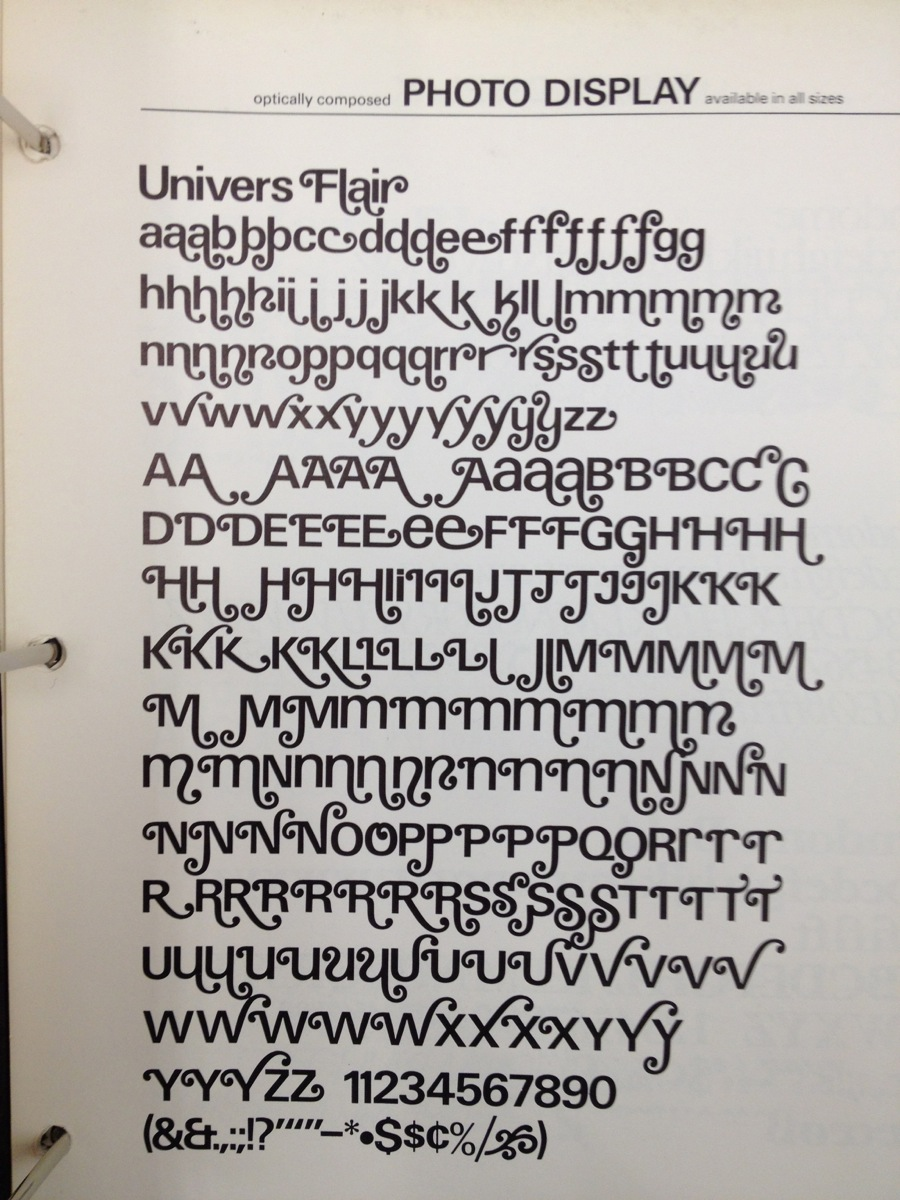
A specimen sheet of Univers Flair.

Frutiger (with Howard "Bud" Kettler) adapted Univers for the IBM Selectric Composer in the 1960s. This was an ultra-premium electric 'golfball' typewriter system, intended to be used for producing high-quality office documents or copy to be photographically enlarged for small-scale printing projects. Unlike most typewriters, the Composer produced proportional type, rather than monospaced letters. Ultimately the system proved a transitional product, as it was displaced by cheaper phototypesetting, and then in the 1980s by word processors and general-purpose computers. The release was somewhat compromised due having to be made to fit a 9-unit escapement system.

Several pirate versions of Univers have been released taking advantage of the lack of copyright protection of typeface designs. One unusual modified version was "Univers Flair", a 1970s phototype clone from Phil Martin's "Alphabet Innovations", adding ostentatious swashes. Frutiger, who found it amusing, placed a specimen on his office wall.

=== URW Classic Sans ===
Univers 45, 55, 65, 57, 67, 53 and 63 (regular and bold weights with obliques in regular and condensed widths) are incorporated in the PostScript 3 digital printing standard as core fonts. As part of the Ghostscript project to create a free alternative to PostScript, URW++ donated its clones of these weights under the series name U001, and then as URW Classic Sans under the Aladdin Free Public License.

=== Linotype Univers ===
In 1997 Frutiger reworked the whole Univers family in cooperation with Linotype, thus creating the Linotype Univers, which consists of 63 fonts. By reworking the Univers more "extreme" weights as Ultra Light or Extended Heavy were added as well as some monospaced typefaces. The numbering system was extended to three digits to reflect the larger number of variations in the family.

In addition to extra font width and weight combinations, the fonts are digitally interpolated, so that character widths scale uniformly with changing font weights. For fonts within a specific font weight, caps height, x-height, ascender and descender heights are the same. For oblique fonts, the slope is increased from 12° to the 16° of Frutiger's original drawings, and the character widths were adjusted optically. In addition, characters such as &, ®, euro sign, are redesigned, the ampersand to Frutiger's preferred true et ligature.

=== Linotype Univers Typewriter ===
Linotype Univers Typewriter is a sub-family of fixed-width fonts under the Linotype Univers family. Four fonts have been produced in Regular and Bold weights, with obliques on each weight. Characters such as 1, I, J, M, W, i, j, l, dotless j are drawn differently.

=== Univers Next (2010) ===
In 2010, Linotype extended the Linotype Univers family with true small caps and renamed as "Univers Next". All later extensions of the font family were marketed under the Univers Next title.

The font family includes all fonts previously released under the Linotype Univers title.

=== Univers Cyrillic, Univers Pro Cyrillic (2010) ===
In April 2010, Linotype announced the release of Cyrillic versions of the original Univers family, in TrueType, PostScript, and OpenType Pro font formats. Released fonts include Univers 55 Roman Oblique; Univers Pro Cyrillic 45 (roman, oblique), 55 (roman, oblique), 65 (roman, oblique), 75 (roman, oblique), 85 (roman, oblique), 47 (roman, oblique), 57 (roman, oblique), 67 (roman, oblique), 39 (roman), 49 (roman), 59 (roman).

=== Univers Next W1G ===
This version supports Greek and Cyrillic characters.

The font family includes 12 fonts (330, 331, 430, 431, 530, 531, 630, 631, 730, 731, 830, 831) in 6 weights and 1 width, with complementary obliques.

The Cyrillic version was released as Univers Next Cyrillic in OpenType Pro format.

=== Univers Next Arabic (2011) ===
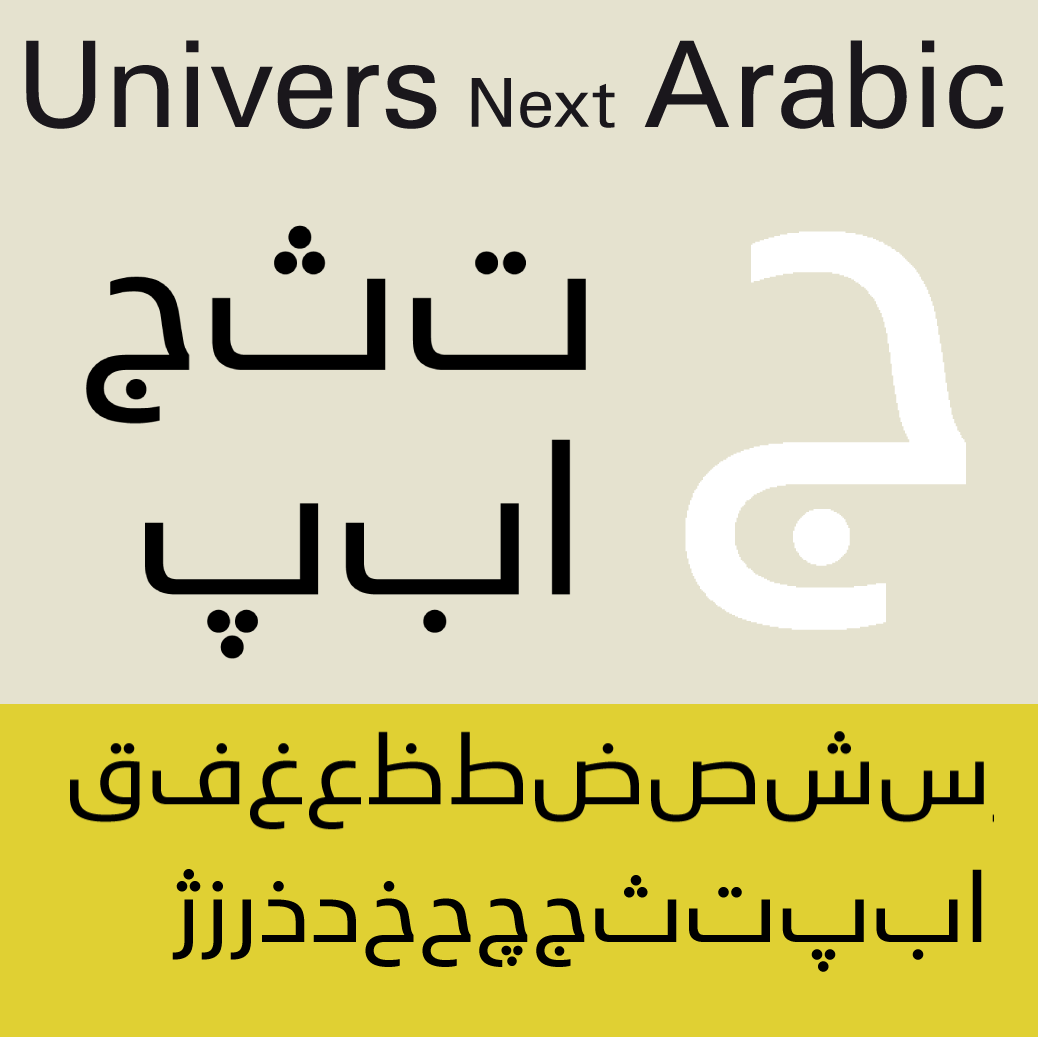
Univers Next Arabic.

Univers Next Arabic is a companion to the Latin typeface Univers Next designed by Nadine Chahine with the consulting of Adrian Frutiger. It is a modern Kufi design with large open counters and low contrast, mainly designed to work in titles and short runs of text. The font includes the basic Latin part of Univers Next and support for Persian, Urdu and Arabic. It also includes proportional and tabular numerals for the supported languages.

The font family consists of 3 fonts (330, 430, 630) in 3 weights and 1 width, without obliques. OpenType features include fraction, localized forms, proportional figures, contextual alternates, discretionary ligatures, initial forms, terminal forms, glyph composition/decomposition, isolated forms, medial forms, required ligatures.
