= Egyptienne (typeface) =

Typeface

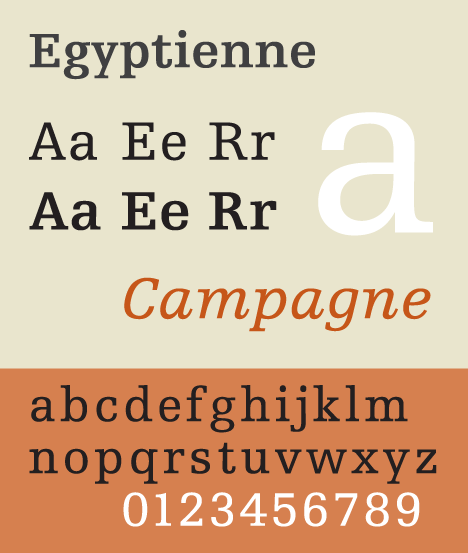
- Category: Serif
- Classification: Slab serif
- Designer: Adrian Frutiger
- Foundry: Mergenthaler Linotype Company
- Date released: 1956

Égyptienne is a Swiss serif typeface belonging to the classification slab serif, or Egyptian, where the serifs are unbracketed and similar in weight to the horizontal strokes of the letters. Egyptienne was designed in 1956 by Adrian Frutiger for the Fonderie Deberny et Peignot and was the first new text face created for the process of phototypesetting.

The x-height is high, and some lowercase characters, especially a and e bear comparison with other Frutiger typefaces, especially Meridien and Serifa. Egyptienne shows historical influence of the Clarendon faces.

Égyptienne commonly appears on Chocolate letters.

Égyptienne Rounded is also used on the printing label of "Music and Lyrics by Bryan Daly" of the Woodland Animations for the BBC Children's TV programme Bertha (other credits on the card labels on the crates used Stencil).
