= Serifa =

- Category: Serif
- Classification: Slab serif
- Designer: Adrian Frutiger
- Date created: 1967
- Design based on: Univers

Serifa is a slab serif typeface family created by Adrian Frutiger in 1967. The typeface is based on the Univers family.

== Usage ==
It was most prominently featured in the logo of Montgomery Ward from 1982 to 1992 and again in the revived online store. It was also used in the campaign ads for Ross Perot's 1992 Presidential campaign and from 1982 to late 1987 on the graphics of various CBS News programming, and for the local news programs at the CBS owned-and-operated television stations (as well as several affiliates). In 2014 Jake Tilson used it in the NT signage to complement the NT logo. Serifa is also used in nearly all of the College Board's communications and exams.

== Related fonts ==
- Glypha, a variation of Serifa by Frutiger in 1980, is narrower and has a larger x-height.
- DilleniaUPC, a Thai typeface that comes preinstalled with Microsoft Windows, contains Latin glyphs which are identical to those of Serifa, except that those of DilleniaUPC have less width (condensed) compared to those of Serifa.
- Hepta Slab is a free and open-source font that is quite similar to Serifa.
