= Frutiger (typeface) =

Humanist sans-serif typeface

- Category: Sans-serif
- Classification: Humanist
- Designer: Adrian Frutiger
- Foundry: Linotype
- Date released: 1976
- License: Commercial
- Variations: Frutiger Next

Frutiger (Swiss Standard German pronunciation: [ˈfruːtɪɡər]) is a series of typefaces named after its Swiss designer, Adrian Frutiger. Frutiger is a humanist sans-serif typeface, intended to be clear and highly legible at a distance or at small text sizes. A popular design worldwide, type designer Steve Matteson described its structure as "the best choice for legibility in pretty much any situation" at small text sizes, while Erik Spiekermann named it as "the best general typeface ever".

== Distinctive characteristics ==
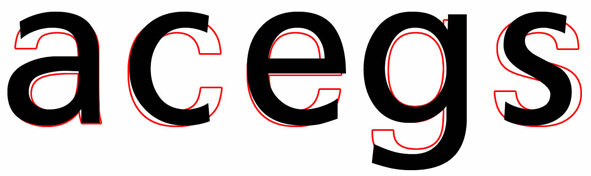
Frutiger (black) overlaid over Adrian Frutiger's previous design Univers (outlined). A consistent feature of Frutiger is wide-open apertures between strokes, in contrast to the more folded-up design of Univers.

Characteristics of this typeface are:

Lowercase
square dot over the letters i and j; double-storey a, single-storey g. Wide, open apertures on letters such as a, e and s. Very high x-height, increasing its clarity.
Uppercase
Wide A with a very low centre bar, though less obvious in bold weight. Q with a stroke below the circle only. Univers-like M, square and with centre strokes descending to the base of the letter.
Figures
diagonal serif on the 1; closed 4.
Oblique
The slanted version is an oblique in which the letterforms are slanted, rather than a true italic. Some versions not drawn by Frutiger do add a true italic (see Frutiger Next below).

The typeface in its original incarnation uses the Frutiger numbering system.

== History ==
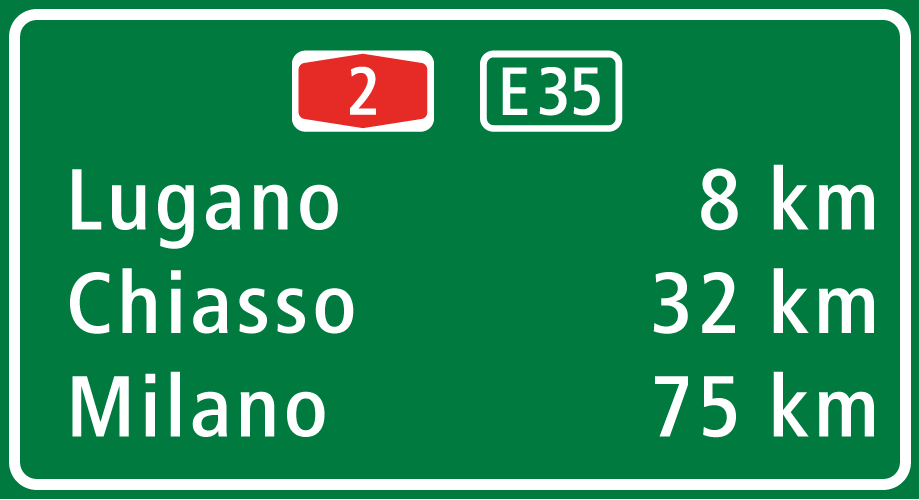
Swiss road signs near Lugano use the typeface ASTRA-Frutiger.

Frutiger is a sans-serif typeface by the Swiss type designer Adrian Frutiger. It is the text version of Frutiger's earlier typeface Roissy, commissioned in 1970/71 by the newly built Charles de Gaulle Airport at Roissy-en-France, France, which needed a new directional sign system, which itself was based on Concorde, a font Frutiger had created in the early 1960s.

The beginning of Frutiger starts from Concorde, a sans-serif font Frutiger was commissioned to design in 1961-4 by the minor metal type company Sofratype. Frutiger was asked to create a design that would not be too similar to his previous Univers, a reinvention of classic 19th-century typefaces. In practice the design was drawn by his colleague (and fellow Swiss in Paris) André Gürtler as Frutiger was busy. Frutiger wrote of it: "I felt I was on the right track with this grotesque; it was a truly novel typeface." Gürtler too wrote of feeling that the design was innovative: "this style didn't exist in grotesques at the time, except for Gill Sans." Despite Frutiger and Gürtler's enthusiasm, the design failed to sell well and was discontinued with the end of the metal type period: Frutiger wrote that Linotype, who bought Sofratype, "weren't aware of the fact that with Concorde they had a totally up-to-date typeface."

Some years later, Frutiger was commissioned to develop a typeface for Roissy Airport. Frutiger had earlier created an alphabet inspired by Univers and Peignot for Paris Orly Airport, but found the experience a failure due to lack of control and the insistence that all text be in capitals only. As a result, he proposed a modified version of Concorde, refining it following research into legibility. The Roissy typeface was completed in 1972. Impressed by the quality of the Roissy airport signage, the typographical director of the Mergenthaler Linotype Company approached Frutiger in 1974 to turn it into a typeface for print.

In designing the typeface's predecessors Concorde and Roissy, Frutiger's goal had been to create a sans-serif typeface with the rationality and cleanliness of Univers but the organic and proportional aspects of Gill Sans. According to Frutiger, "What was important, was total clarity – [he] would even call it nudity – an absence of any kind of artistic addition." Designing Frutiger as a print version of Roissy, this principle resulted in a distinctive and legible typeface. The letter properties originally suited to the needs of Charles de Gaulle: a modern appearance and legibility at various angles, sizes, and distances. Ascenders and descenders are very prominent, and apertures are wide to easily distinguish letters from one another. While the open apertures of the lowercase letters a, c, e and s are testament to the humanist design, other characters are more similar in proportion to grotesque and neo-grotesque types like Frutiger's own Univers. Improvements on Roissy included better spacing.

The Frutiger family was released publicly in 1976 by the Stempel type foundry in conjunction with Linotype. Frutiger became extremely popular for uses such as corporate and transportation branding. In 2008 it was the fifth best-selling typeface of the Linotype foundry.

=== Frutiger Linotype ===
This is a version of the original Frutiger font family licensed to Microsoft. This family consists of Frutiger 55, 56, 65, and 66. It does not include OpenType features or kerning, but it adds support to Latin Extended-B and Greek characters, with Frutiger 55 supporting extra IPA characters and spacing modifier letters. Unlike most Frutiger variants, Frutiger Linotype features old-style figures as the default numeral style.

Frutiger Linotype can be found in Microsoft products featuring Microsoft Reader and in the standalone Microsoft Reader package.

=== ASTRA-Frutiger ===
This is a variant of Frutiger used by ASTRA (acronym of the Amt für Strassen, the Swiss Federal Road Office) as the new font for traffic signs, replacing VSS in 2003. It is based on Frutiger 57 Condensed, but with widening ascenders and descenders, which are intended to give the eye a better hold than the earlier version did.

A family of two fonts were made, called ASTRA-Frutiger-Standard/standard and ASTRA-Frutiger-Autobahn/autoroute.

== Frutiger Next (2000) ==
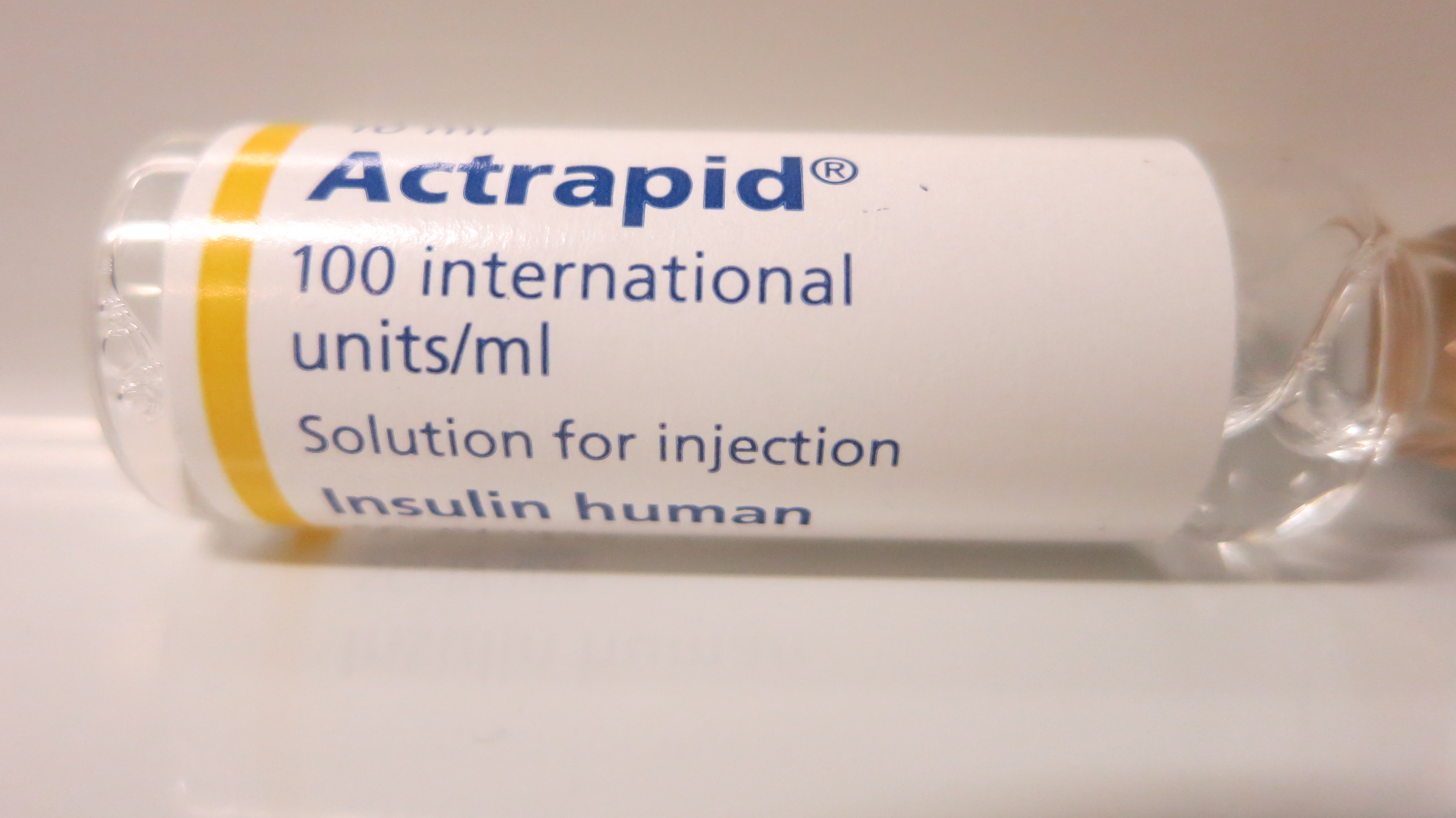
Frutiger is often used on pharmaceuticals, as seen on this insulin vial.

The Frutiger family was updated in 1997 for signage at the Alte Pinakothek in Munich. The new version, Frutiger Next, changed a number of details and added a true italic style in place of the oblique roman of the original.

Frutiger Next was commercially available in 2000 under Linotype. The family include six font weights, with a bonus Ultra Light weight in the OpenType version. It supports ISO Adobe 2, Adobe CE, and Latin Extended characters. OpenType features include small caps, old style figures, superscript and subscript, ordinals, proportional lining figures, and case forms. Font names are no longer numbered with the Frutiger system. Frutiger Black was renamed to Frutiger Next Heavy, and Frutiger Ultra Black was changed to Frutiger Next Black. Condensed fonts no longer include italic variants. In addition to italic type, characters such as the cent sign (¢), the copyright symbol (©), the ampersand (&), the at sign (@), the sharp S (ß), Omega (Ω), and the integral symbol (∫) were redesigned. Cyrillic letters had not been produced until Frutiger Next W1G.

While Frutiger Next added considerably to Frutiger's feature set, it added a modish 1990s true italic (not drawn by Frutiger) instead of the sharper oblique Frutiger preferred for sans-serif typefaces throughout his career, over Frutiger's objections. In his autobiography, Frutiger commented that in resigning himself to it "Maybe I was too soft to say what I really felt...I didn't have the strength and patience anymore."

=== Frutiger Next Greek (2005) ===
This is a variant of Frutiger Next designed with Eva Masoura for Linotype, originally published as a TDC2 2006 entry.

=== Frutiger Next W1G (2009) ===
This is an expanded version of Frutiger Next W1G. It added Greek (from Frutiger Next Greek) and Cyrillic character sets, but advertised OpenType features were reduced to superscript and subscript. Only an OpenType version has been produced.

== Frutiger Arabic (2007) ==
This is a font family designed by Lebanese designer Nadine Chahine as a companion to Frutiger in consultation with Adrian Frutiger. It is based on the Kufic style, but incorporates aspects of Ruqʿah script and Naskh in the letter form designs, resulting in what Linotype called "humanist Kufi". The fonts consist of Basic Latin and ISO-Latin characters derived from the original Frutiger family, with Arabic characters supporting presentation forms A and B. Four font weights were produced.

== Frutiger Serif (2008) ==
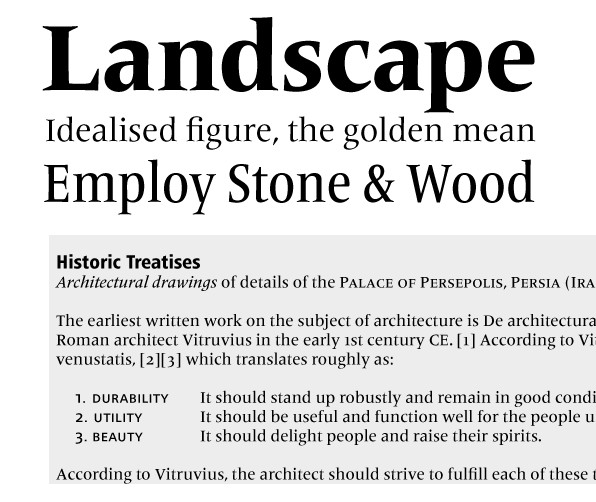
Frutiger Next in use with Frutiger Serif, an adaptation of his earlier Méridien

This is a serif font family designed by Adrian Frutiger and Akira Kobayashi. It is a re-envisioning of the metal type version of Meridien, a typeface first released by Deberny & Peignot during the 1950s.

The family consists of roman and italic fonts in five weights and two widths each.

== Neue Frutiger (2009) ==
This is an expanded version of the original Frutiger family designed by Adrian Frutiger and Akira Kobayashi. Unlike the original family, the Frutiger numbering scheme is not used.

Initial release of the family has twenty fonts in ten weights and one width, returning to complementary obliques. It supports ISO Adobe, Adobe CE, and Latin Extended characters. OpenType features include subscript and superscript.

=== Neue Frutiger Condensed (2010) ===
On April 7, 2010, Monotype Imaging Holdings announced condensed versions of the Neue Frutiger fonts. Designed by Akira Kobayashi, the expansion of the family includes twenty fonts in the same weight and style combination as the original release, in OpenType Pro font format.

=== Neue Frutiger W1G (2011) ===
This version supports Greek and Cyrillic characters.

The family includes forty fonts in ten weights and two widths, with a complementary oblique.

== Neue Frutiger 1450 (2013) ==
It is a version of Neue Frutiger compliant with the German standard DIN 1450, designed by Akira Kobayashi.

The family includes eight fonts, in four weights (book, regular, medium, bold) and one width, with a complementary oblique.

OpenType features include denominator/numerator, fractions, ligatures, localized forms, ordinals, proportional figures, subscript/superscript, scientific inferiors, stylistic alternates (two sets), ornaments, kerning.

== Neue Frutiger World (2018) ==
In 2018, Monotype introduced Neue Frutiger World with several characters more than 150 languages, in Latin, Greek, Cyrillic, Georgian, Armenian, Hebrew, Arabic, Thai and Vietnamese, and also in Chinese, Japanese, and Korean characters.

== Similar types ==
Adobe's Myriad and Microsoft's Segoe UI are two prominent humanist typefaces whose similarities to Frutiger have aroused controversy. Frutiger described Myriad as 'not badly done' but said that the similarities had gone 'a little too far'. However, in an interview, Adrian Frutiger commended the work of Myriad's co-designer, Robert Slimbach: "except the unnecessary doubt concerning Myriad, his work is also very good." Additionally, the italic style of Myriad is cursive, while the original version of Frutiger uses a slanted Roman style rather than a true italic.

In the 1970s, Frutiger designed Icone, a wedge-serif design with mild stroke modulation, which has many similarities in basic letter structure to Frutiger, and in overall effect to Albertus.

Freeset, designed by Tagir Safayev in Russian foundry ParaType in 1992, was based on Frutiger and looks identical to it. ParaType would later release a similar typeface, Fact, in 2018, designed by Alexandra Korolkova and Manvel Shmavonyan.

Sony's SST, designed by Akira Kobayashi in 2013, was modeled after Frutiger and Helvetica, the latter of which Sony had used previously.

Free typefaces inspired by Frutiger, but not without creative liberties to it, include Aganè, by Italian designer Danilo de Marco in 2017, and LT Asus (after Taiwanese computer manufacturer Asus), by American designer Daniel Lyons in 2021. A more faithful imitation exists in Hind, a Devanagari-script typeface by the Indian Type Foundry.

== Awards ==
- Frutiger Next won the bukva:raz! competition in the Latin category.
- Frutiger Next Greek won the TDC2 2006 award under the Type System / Superfamily category.

== Usage ==
Michael Bierut commented on its common use in wayfinding systems: "Frutiger has been used so much for signage programs in hospitals and airports that seeing it now makes me feel that I'm about to get diagnosed with a brain tumor or miss the 7:00 to O'Hare."

Frutiger is the corporate font of Amtrak, and is the standard font for their signage.

== Other 'Frutiger' fonts ==
A number of other designs by Frutiger carry his name without having any connection to the Frutiger typeface itself. They are listed here for reference.

=== Frutiger Stones (1998) ===
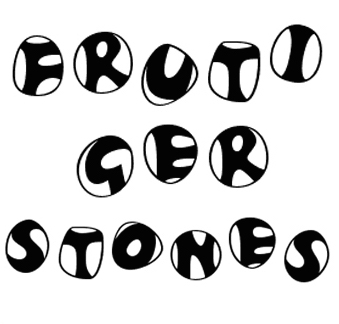
Sample of the font Frutiger Stones

This is a family of casual fonts inspired by natural elements. Using polished pebbles as the boundary, the family consists of regular, positive, and negative fonts. Frutiger Stones Positive is Regular without the stone outline, while Negative is a reverse fill of the Regular.

=== Frutiger Symbols (1998) ===
This is a family of symbol fonts. The fonts contain plants, animals, and stars, as well as religious and mythological symbols. The naming convention follows Frutiger Stones.

=== Frutiger Capitalis (2005) ===
This is a family of casual fonts that consists of regular, outline, and signs fonts. Frutiger Capitalis Outline is the outline version of Frutiger Capitalis Regular. Frutiger Capitalis contains ornamental glyphs of religions, hand signs, and astrological signs.

== In popular culture ==
The Frutiger typeface retrospectively gave its name to the 2000s internet aesthetic Frutiger Aero, due to the typeface's heavy use in similar settings to this design style, and due to Adrian Frutiger's humanist fonts inspiring those that would go on to be used in Microsoft products of the 2000s.

== See also ==
- Typography
- Public signage typefaces
- Segoe UI Licensing Controversy

== Bibliography ==
- Meggs, Philip, and Rob Carter. Typographic Specimens: The Great Typefaces. Van Nostrand Reinhold: 1993, p. 163. ISBN 0-442-00758-2.
- Gibson, Jennifer. "Univers and Frutiger." Revival of the Fittest: Digital Versions of Classical Typefaces, Ed. Philip Meggs and Roy McKelvey. RC Publications: 2000, pp. 176–177. ISBN 1-883915-08-2.
