= Méridien (typeface) =

Serif typeface

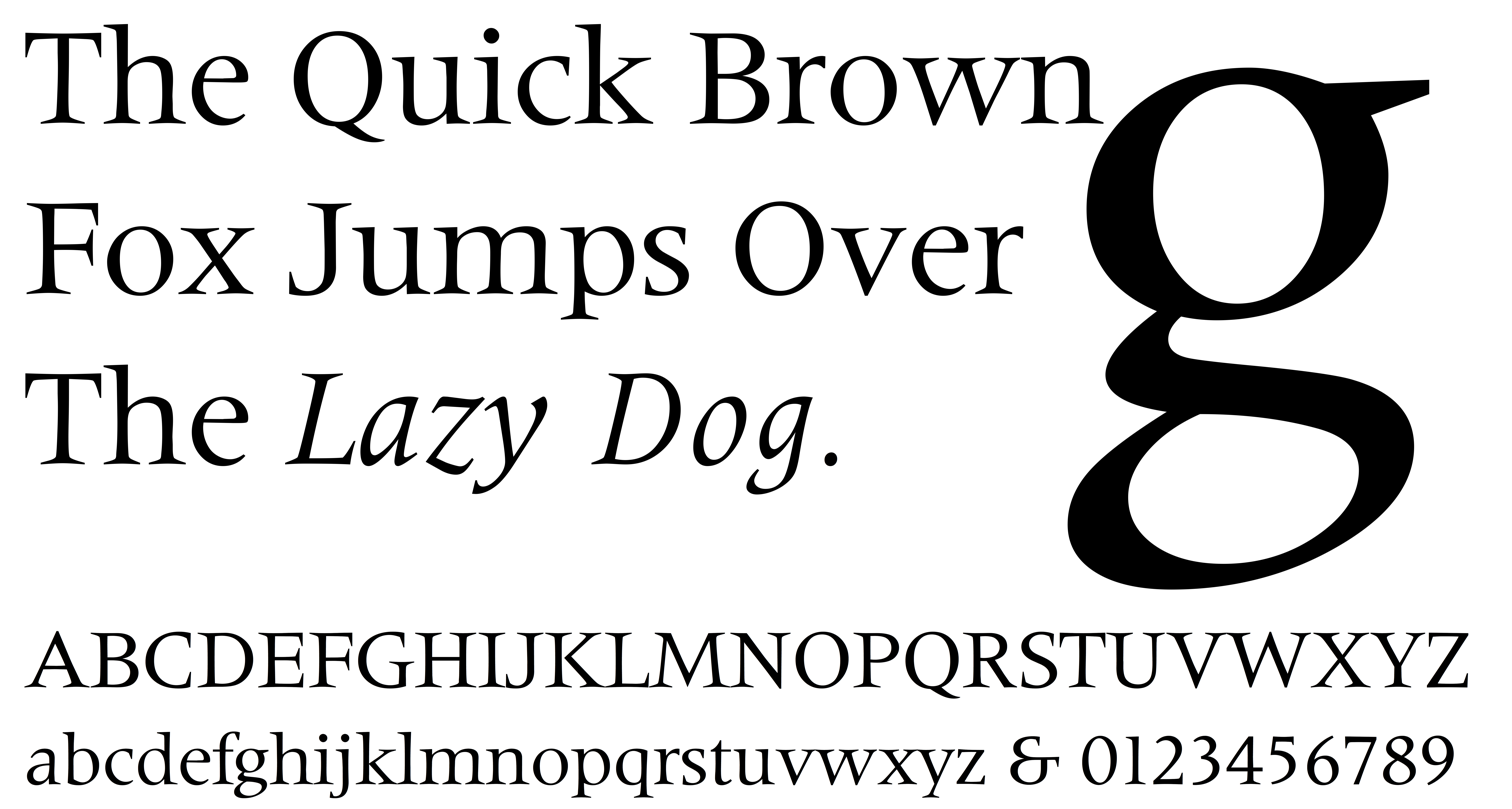
Sample image of Méridien

Méridien is a serif typeface designed by Adrian Frutiger and released by Deberny & Peignot in 1955 for its phototypesetting system.

Intended as a typeface suitable for text use, Méridien takes inspiration from 'Latin' or wedge-serif typefaces, with their sharp, exaggerated serifs, but in a more restrained style intended to be suitable for body text, with a wide spacing. It is one of several typefaces designed by Frutiger in this genre; his Apollo for Monotype is quite similar.

Méridien was later published by Linotype, who released a digitisation in collaboration with Adobe. An updated digitisation was released under the name of "Frutiger Serif" with additional weights and condensed styles.
