= Akira Kobayashi (typographer) =

Akira Kobayashi (小林 章, born 1960) is a Japanese font designer living in Germany. As type director for Monotype, he oversees typeface design and reprints of classic typefaces such as Optima. He has also served as a judge in several international typeface contests. He previously worked at Shaken (写研), and later designed the European characters for Hiragino Mincho and AXIS Font. He is a leading figure in designing Western typefaces in Japan, and has co-developed fonts with Hermann Zapf and Adrian Frutiger. Kobayashi grew up in Japan and has written a Japanese-language book about Western fonts, titled "西文字体" ("Western font").

His work has been profiled in Communication Arts magazine. Print Magazine featured him in an interview, as did Sony Design.
