= Nadine Chahine =

Lebanese type designer

- Education: American University of Beirut (B.S.); The University of Reading (M.A.)
- Occupation: Typeface designer

Nadine Chahine (in Arabic: نادين شاهين) is a Lebanese type designer working as the CEO at I Love Typography Ltd and the Director at ArabicType Ltd. From 2005 to 2015 she worked as the Arabic Specialist at Linotype and Monotype Imaging and from 2015 to 2018 as the UK Type Director and Legibility Expert at Monotype UK. She designed Arabic versions of the popular typefaces Helvetica, Frutiger, and Zapfino. Her typeface Koufiya was the first to include a simultaneously designed matching Arabic and Latin parts.

Nadine Chanine was selected as one (69th) of the 100 most creative people ranked by Fast Company magazine.
