= Miro Kepinski =

- Also known as: MIRO
- Born: Mirosław Kępiński; July 27, 1980 (age 45); Mława, Poland
- Origin: Mława
- Genres: soundtrack; neoclassical; minimal
- Occupations: film composer, music producer, performer
- Years active: 2000s–present
- Website: MiroKepinski.com

Mirosław Kępiński (born 27 July 1980 in Mława, Poland), known by his stage name Miro Kepinski, is a Polish film composer, music producer, and performer.

Graduating from a Classical Music school in Mlawa, Poland as Musician Instrumentalist (Classical Guitar), he then expanded his musical knowledge by enrolling at the Jazz faculty of the Academy of Music in Katowice, Poland, graduating with the title ‘Bachelor of Art’. Miro has gone on to enjoy a career playing a broad palette of musical styles including classical, rock and electronic. Miro composes mainly for film and his compositions can be heard in productions all over the world from Sydney to Los Angeles. His most recent credits include the multiple-award-winning feature documentary 'The Wounds We Cannot See' by Alexander Freeman, drama 'In This Gray Place' by R.D.Womack II and a dark-comedy, horror 'Suicide for Beginners' by Craig Thieman. His music mixes minimalism with a ‘rawness’ of the north and a Slavic melancholy blended with the classic sounds.

== MIRO ==
In 2014, Kepinski founded a post-rock, ambient solo music project where he played the electric guitar. On March 6, 2015 MIRO has released a 5-track maxi single Be There. Track 'Be There' [original mix] was mixed by Aaron Harris, an acclaimed mixing engineer and ex-drummer of Isis and mastered by Maor Appelbaum.

== Tanana ==
In 2015, Miro founded an electronic music project called Tanana. Tanana's debut EP, Star, was released on December 18, 2015. In 2016 Miro teamed up with a vocalist Steve Krolikowski from ex-band Repeater and Fear and the Nervous System, the conceptual side project of Korn's James 'Munky' Shaffer. This collaboration resulted in releasing an EDM track 'Situation'.

== Film scores and other projects ==
- In This Gray Place - USA, 2018 - directed by R.D.Womack II
- Suicide for Beginners - USA, 2018 - directed by Craig Thieman
- The Wounds We Cannot See - USA, 2017 - directed by Alexander Freeman
- Just Coffee - USA, 2017 - directed by Matt Dressel
- Happy Birthday - USA, 2017 - directed by Kyle Kelley
- Hello - USA, 2017 - directed by Ty Jones
- Night Shift - POL, 2016 - project commissioned by Warsaw Uprising Museum
- Metanoia - Australia, 2016 - directed by Quanith Illahi
- Going Up - USA, 2016 - directed by Alexander Freeman
- Image of the Enemy - USA, 2015 - directed by Leo Lopez III
- The Bag - USA, 2015 - directed by Alexander Freeman
- The Last Taboo - USA, 2013 - directed by Alexander Freeman
- Seven Days - USA, 2013 - directed by Alexander Freeman
- Play Time - USA, 2013 - directed by Alexander Freeman
- Face Time - USA, 2013 - directed by Rod Dixon

== Awards and nominations ==
- Outstanding Achievement Award - Calcutta International Cult Film Festival 2017
- Best Original Music/Score - Winner - Los Angeles Independent Film Festival Awards 2016
- Music Score - Award of Recognition - Hollywood International Moving Pictures Film Festival 2016
- Music Score - Award of Recognition - Hollywood International Independent Documentary Awards 2016
- ORIGINAL SCORE FOR A DOCUMENTARY FEATURE (Nomination) - 2017 Reel Music Awards

== Discography ==
As Miro Kepinski

- 一 (single) - 2016
- Where are You? (single) - 2016
- The Wounds We Cannot See (OST) - 2016
- Deep Trip (EP) - 2016
- Endless Sacrifice (EP) - 2016
- The Kraken (OST) - 2016
- Primal Time (EP) - 2016
- Shaped (Single) - 2016
- Elementi (EP) - 2016

As Tanana:

- Traces (EP) - 2016
- Hot Wave (single) - 2016
- Do It (single) - 2016
- Situation feat. Steve Krolikowski (single) - 2016
- Teslanation (single) - 2016
- Up (single) - 2015
- Star (EP) - 2015

As MIRO

- Be There (single) - 2015
