= The Main Frame =

- Origin: Long Beach, California, U.S.
- Genres: Dark wave, indie rock, post-punk
- Years active: 2001–2005
- Label: Bird in Hand Records
- Past members: Steve Krolikowski; Rob Wallace; Bill “Dungs” Roman; Vaughn Klemz; Trip Waterhouse

The Main Frame was a dark wave band from Long Beach, California formed in 2001 by Steve Krolikowski (vocals and guitar), Rob Wallace (keyboard), Bill “Dungs” Roman (bass) and Vaughn Klemz (drums). Vaughn Klemz was replaced by Trip Waterhouse in 2003. The band dissolved in 2005. Krolikowski continued playing with Wallace and eventually formed the band Repeater. Krolikowski also joined Korn's Munky-led supergroup, Fear and the Nervous System.

== Recordings ==
The Main Frame recorded one full-length album Curse of Evolution (2003) and several unreleased EPs.

"Beat To Death" and "Weak Exit" are two songs from the band's 2004 unreleased EP that appear on IFC Films' American Gun.

== Discography ==
Studio Albums

- Curse of Evolution (2003)

EPs

- Skull EP (2002)
- Beat To Death EP (2004)

== Reviews ==
"Haunting, stark pop that stands out, and relatively alone in the oft-flashy LA music scene" OC Weekly

"Synthesizer driven sophistication with undeniably dark undertones" Tangerine Magazine
