= List of Moog synthesizer players =

This is a list of notable musicians who use Moog synthesizers.

== A ==
- ABBA – a minimoog and polymoog played by Benny Andersson
- Patrick Adams
- Walter Afanasieff – Producer
- Air
- Don Airey
- Damon Albarn – Blur
- The Anniversary
- Apoptygma Berzerk
- Arandel
- Arjen Lucassen
- Army of Freshmen
- Alesso

== B ==
- Tony Banks – Genesis – Used a Polymoog mostly on And Then There Were Three (1978) information on the book from Armando Gallo – I Know What I Like (DIY) 1981
- Basilica and National Shrine of Our Lady of Consolation Many Synthesizers are used in the church's keyboard section
- Les Baxter (See in 1968, Moog Rock Album)
- Armin Van Buuren
- Leroy Bach – Wilco
- Zac Baird – Korn, Everlast, Fear and the Nervous System, Jonathan Davis and the SFA, Maimou
- Peter Bardens – Camel
- Battlecat – Hip hop producer (Snoop Dogg)
- Peter Baumann – solo and with (Tangerine Dream) - Moog modular
- Beastie Boys
- The Beach Boys
- The Beatles – one of the first mainstream albums to use a Moog was Abbey Road
- Paul Beaver
- Bee Gees – "Sweet Song of Summer", To Whom It May Concern (1972); one of the earliest implementations of a Moog in a popular music record (LP)
- Nuno Bettencourt – Extreme, Population1
- Marek Biliński – Polish electronic music composer. On his debut album, Garden Of The King Of Dawn, he solely used Minimoog, Polymoog and Micromoog.
- Blackmail
- Tim Blake – Crystal Machine -Gong & Hawkwind – Moog modular 55, minimoog
- Paul Bley – First live performance of a Moog, at Lincoln Center in 1969
- Blondie
- David Borden – Mother Mallard
- David Bowie
- The Boxing Lesson – use Moog extensively, often in place of a bass guitar
- Black Label Society – Moog used by Zakk Wylde extensively on the 2005 Mafia Album.
- Big Wu
- Bon Jovi - Memorymoog

== C ==
- Cake
- Wendy Carlos – Wendy Carlos was one of the first users of Moog's equipment. She even collaborated with Moog during the development of his equipment.
- Jesse Carmichael – Maroon 5
- Matt Cameron – The drummer of the popular American grunge band Soundgarden.
- Jane Child
- José Cid – On the album 10,000 Anos Depois Entre Venus e Marte
- CKY
- Todd Tamanend Clark
- Vince Clarke – Erasure – Yazoo
- Charlie Clouser – Nine Inch Nails
- CHVRCHES
- Cloudland Canyon
- Phil Collins, Minimoog bassline on "Sussudio" & "Who Said I Would" from the album No Jacket Required (1985)
- Coldplay
- Jenny Conlee – The Decemberists
- Norman Cook
- Tom Coppola
- The Chemical Brothers
- Chick Corea
- Chris Cox
- Chris Cross – Ultravox – Minimoog
- Graham Coxon – Blur
- Joel Cummins – of Umphrey's Mcgee
- The Cure
- Lee Curreri
- The Crystal Method
- Charly Garcia
- Cory Henry – Snarky Puppy
- Tony Carey – Rainbow Rising – Minimoog

== D ==
- DJ Logic
- DJ Quik
- Daft Punk
- Dana Countryman
- Paul Davis
- Dean Fertita-Queens of the Stone Age, The Dead Weather
- Dave Greenfield – The Stranglers
- David Crowder – David Crowder Band
- Deadmau5
- Dead Disco
- Deep Forest
- Deftones
- Dennis DeYoung – Styx
- Depeche Mode – (used Moog Prodigy, Moog Source)
- James Dewees – The Get Up Kids and Reggie and the Full Effect
- Devo
- Travis Dickerson
- Disclosure (band)
- Thomas Dolby
- Don Dorsey – Composer/engineer of Disney's "Main Street Electrical Parade"
- Neal Doughty – REO Speedwagon
- Micky Dolenz – The Monkees
- Geoff Downes – Buggles, Yes, Asia
- Daryl Dragon
- Dr. Dre
- DragonForce
- Dream Theater
- Dubstar
- Duchess Says
- George Duke
- Jimmy Destri-Blondie Major songwriter and keyboardist who was one of the first users of the Polymoog in such hits as "Heart of Glass" and "Atomic"
- Larry Dunn – Earth, Wind & Fire
- The Dust Brothers
- Lisa Bella Donna

== E ==
- Steve Earle
- Edan
- Keith Emerson – Emerson, Lake & Palmer – Emerson, Lake & Powell -Known to be among the first user of Moog products from 1968, specially a massive custom built modular synthesizer that can be seen in most of his live performances
- Brian Eno – Roxy Music
- Gene Eugene – Adam Again and Starflyer 59
- Everyone Asked About You

== F ==
- Harold Faltermeyer - used Model 15 e.g. on Axel F. (bass)
- Fatboy Slim
- Michael Farrell (musician) – Morrissey, Macy Gray
- Susan Fassbender
- Larry Fast
- Franz Ferdinand
- Dean Fertita – Queens of the Stone Age, The Dead Weather
- Doug Fieger – The Knack
- John Fogerty
- Ben Folds
- David Foster (used mostly Minimoog during the 1980s and 1990s, and occasionally used Moog Source and Memorymoog during the 1980s)
- Christopher Franke – Tangerine Dream Known from the Virgin years records as a user of a massive custom IIIp modular system, and also a minimoog – Rubycon, Ricochet (1975), and memorymoog
- Friendly Fires
- Florian Fricke who sold his modular to Klaus Schulze.
- Eloy Fritsch – Apocalypse
- Hans-Jürgen Fritz – Keyboardist of the German prog band Triumvirat.
- Edgar Froese – Tangerine Dream Known from the Virgin years records as a user of a custom IIIp modular system, and also a minimoog, polymoog & memorymoog
- Front Line Assembly
- John Frusciante – Red Hot Chili Peppers

== G ==
- Madonna Wayne Gacy – Marilyn Manson
- Charly García
- Gaudi
- Maurice Gibb – Bee Gees – "Sweet Song of Summer" To Whom It May Concern (1972)
- Gregg Giuffria
- Mort Garson – The Wozard of Iz (1969), Black Mass Lucifer (1971), Plantasia (1976)
- Martin L. Gore – Depeche Mode
- John Green - London based session keyboard player
- Dave Greenfield – The Stranglers
- Goldfrapp
- Patrick Gleeson San Francisco-based keyboardist, pioneered synthesizers in rock and jazz, played Moog on 1971 rock album Sunfighter and Herbie Hancock's 1972 Crossings

== H ==
- Hailu Mergia
- 4hero
- Jan Hammer – Mahavishnu Orchestra, Jeff Beck, Miami Vice – One of the first users of the Minimoog, known for his guitar-like pitch bending technique.
- George Harrison – One of the first pop albums to use the Moog was his Electronic Sound solo LP, recorded (partially) in 1968 and released early 1969.
- Head East
- Heart
- Herbie Hancock – used a Micromoog, Minimoog and Polymoog, which can be seen on the back cover of his 1979 album Sunlight
- John Hawken – Strawbs
- Heldon
- Gregory Hinde
- Hinterland
- Ken Hensley
- Michael Hoenig - Tangerine Dream & solo. Minimoog
- Nellee Hooper
- HORSE The Band
- Liam Howlett – The Prodigy
- Chad Hugo – The Neptunes, N.E.R.D
- Hybrid
- Dick Hyman

== I ==
- Incubus
- Isao Tomita

== J ==
- J Dilla (used a custom Minimoog Voyager)
- Jack's Mannequin
- Michael Jackson
- James Lascelles – Steve Harley and Cockney Rebel. Played alongside a Korg Trinity ProX-88 keyboard – even in acoustic sets.
- Jane Child
- Janet Jackson
- Randy Jackson (of Journey) – Moog Source (1984–1989, 1993)
- Jimmy Jam – Producer, former member of The Time
- Chris Jasper
- Jean-Michel Jarre
- Joy Electric
- Los Jaivas – used a minimoog on the album Alturas de Macchu Picchu
- Jesse Johnson – Of Motion City Soundtrack
- Adam Jones – Tool
- John Paul Jones – With Led Zeppelin on the song "Friends"
- Billy Joel
- Justice
- Jordan Rudess – Dream Theater and Liquid Tension Experiment

== K ==
- Mark Kelly – Marillion – Used a Minimoog, specially on early albums from 1983 with Fish
- Edd Kalehoff
- Jesse F. Keeler – Death from Above 1979
- Geoffrey Keezer – Christian McBride Band
- Brian Kehew – Half of The Moog Cookbook
- Kenna
- Alicia Keys
- Gershon Kingsley – Music to Moog by, etc.
- Kontour – (Some Bizzare Records)
- Kombi (band) – (used Multimoog)
- Kraftwerk (used Micromoog, Minimoog and Polymoog)
- Lenny Kravitz
- David Kristian
- Pamelia Kurstin – theremin artist.
- Kashif – artist
- Adem K – Australian Indie Rock musician

== L ==
- Craig Leon – Avant garde composer Nommos, Producer for The Ramones, Suicide, Blondie, Andreas Scholl
- Dan Lacksman – Telex, Electronic System
- Ulf Langheinrich
- James Lascelles – Steve Harley and Cockney Rebel. Played alongside a Korg Trinity ProX-88 keyboard – even in acoustic sets.
- Jon Lord – Deep Purple, Whitesnake
- Rhett Lawrence – Producer for The Black Eyed Peas, Kelly Clarkson, Mariah Carey
- Geddy Lee – Rush
- Rita Lee
- Douglas Leedy – Avant garde composer
- Lendi Vexer – Diego Guiñazu
- Lettuce – Lactucarium
- Steve Lindsey
- Christian "Flake" Lorenz (Rammstein)
- Linkin Park
- Louis Johnson – Used on We Are the World and Back on the Block
- Mark Linkous – Sparklehorse
- The Locust – Post-punk/noise rock/crust punk band
- The Lovemakers
- Ludo
- Jeff Lynne – Electric Light Orchestra – Used a Minimoog on Out of the Blue (1977)
- The Listening
- John Linnell – in both They Might Be Giants and the early band The Mundanes
- Sławomir Łosowski – Kombi
- Diana Lewis – used Moog Modular on "First Episode at Hienton" and "The Cage" on Elton John (1970)

== M ==
- Mike Mainieri
- Manfred Mann – Minimoog from the very beginning around 1972, and recently a Moog Voyager
- Mastodon
- Martin Gore
- Roger Manning – The other half of The Moog Cookbook, keyboards for Jellyfish, Imperial Drag, Beck, Air, and TV Eyes
- Mike Pinder – Moody Blues – Used on Question of Balance (1970) and Every Good Boy Deserves Favour Albums (1971)
- Terry Manning – One of the earliest uses (1968) on a rock album Home Sweet Home
- Ray Manzarek – One of the earliest uses on an album, from the psychedelic rock album Strange Days by The Doors
- Tommy Mars – in Frank Zappa's band. Can be heard on several Zappa albums and seen in the movie Baby Snakes.
- The Moog Cookbook
- MGMT – (formerly known as The Management)
- Anthony Marinelli – (synthesizer (and Synclavier) orchestration/composer for film)
- Money Mark
- Hideki Matsutake
- Linda McCartney – Wings
- Paul McCartney
- Page McConnell – Phish
- Roger McGuinn – The Byrds
- Doug McKechnie – a pioneer of synthesizers, highly active in the San Francisco music scene from 1968 to 1972.
- Gabrial McNair – No Doubt, Oslo
- John Medeski – Medeski, Martin and Wood
- Max Middleton
- John Mills-Cockell Electronic musician from Toronto, Canada who recorded and played live with Moog synths in several bands in the late 60s and early 70s.
- Takako Minekawa
- Kerry Minnear – Gentle Giant
- Joni Mitchell – On the song "The Jungle Line" from The Hissing of Summer Lawns
- Moby
- The Monkees – Their song "Daily Nightly" was the first known pop recording to feature a synthesizer, namely the Moog Modular synth purchased by Micky Dolenz, only the third to be sold commercially at the time.
- Francis Monkman
- Hugo Montenegro
- Patrick Moraz – Yes, The Moody Blues, Solo albums – in 1979 he used for "Future Memories" live on TV a Minimoog, a special custom double Minimoog and a Micromoog; a Polymoog can also be seen on stage.
- Morcheeba
- Jim Morrison (The Doors)
- Giorgio Moroder and his team – A portable modular system, Minimoog
- Thurston Moore – Sonic Youth, on Evol
- Steve Morse – Dixie Dregs, Steve Morse Band, Deep Purple, Kansas – In the 70s and 80s Morse played a modified Fender Telecaster run through a homemade effects system using a full Minimoog, both studio and live
- Motion City Soundtrack
- Jason Mraz
- Muse – Minimoogs are used to perform the band's signature synth arpeggios, played live by Dominic Howard and Morgan Nicholls.
- Mutemath – Lead singer/keyboardist Paul Meany added a Moog synth as well as a Hammond B3 to his setup for the band's 2011 Odd Soul Introduction Tour. Moog synthesizers have also featured prominently in some of the band's studio recordings.

== N ==
- Pete Namlook
- Drew Neumann
- New Order
- Czesław Niemen
- Vittorio Nocenzi – with the Minimoog for the band Banco del Mutuo Soccorso
- Erik Norlander – Rocket Scientists, Featuring John Payne, Lana Lane, Bob Moog Foundation
- Gary Numan – notable for the Minimoog, Polymoog and Minimoog Voyager
- Neurosis

== O ==
- Roger O'Donnell – The Cure, Thompson Twins, The Psychedelic Furs, Berlin, Nine Inch Nails
- Mike Oldfield
- William Onyeabor
- Ryo Okumoto – Spock's Beard
- Orchestral Manoeuvres in the Dark
- Fernando Otero – Minimoog

== P ==
- David Paich
- Eduardo Parra Former Keyboardist from Chilean band, Los Jaivas
- Perpetual Groove
- Jean-Jacques Perrey
- Pharrell
- Plastiq Phantom
- Greg Phillinganes
- Phoenix
- Mike Pinder –Moody Blues – Used on A Question of Balance (1970) and Every Good Boy Deserves Favour albums (1971)
- Gino Piserchio
- Bill Plummer
- Portishead – Adrian Utley
- Portugal. The Man
- Roger Powell – Todd Rundgren, and the album of Meat Loaf, Bat Out of Hell
- Billy Preston
- Don Preston
- Steve Porcaro
- Prince
- Flavio Premoli – Premiata Forneria Marconi
- Pull Tiger Tail – British Indie Band; Moog Rogue, MG-1, Taurus 1 pedals and Little Phatty
- PlayRadioPlay! – Daniel Hunter
- The Punk Group – Minimoog Voyager, SubPhatty, Minimoog Model D, Grandmother
- Federico González Peña

== Q ==
- Queens of the Stone Age – Dean Fertita (Uses a Little Phatty)

== R ==
- Radiohead
- Robertinho de Recife
- Radio Massacre International
- Gerry Rafferty – "Whatever's Written in Your Heart". A Minimoog was used for some soft backing effects (as seen in official video).
- Jason Rebello
- Relient K – Select songs
- The Rentals
- The Residents
- Martin Rev
- Trent Reznor – Nine Inch Nails
- Nick Rhodes – Duran Duran
- David Rosenthal – Billy Joel
- Rick Rubin
- Jordan Rudess – Dream Theater, Liquid Tension Experiment
- Leon Russell
- Mike Rutherford – Genesis – Used a Taurus bass pedal from 1975, source from the book "I know what I like" from Armando Gallo 1981
- Rwake
- Kristoffer Garm Rygg – Ulver
- Francis Rimbert
- Rush – Geddy Lee
- Ryuichi Sakamoto

== S ==
- Saga
- Darian Sahanaja – Heart
- David Sancious
- Santana
- Jan Schelhaas
- Jeremy Schmidt of Black Mountain – Moog Source
- Johannes Schmoelling - Minimoog
- Eberhard Schoener – He bought the modular Moog IIIp (previously used by the Beatles) in 1969.
- Klaus Schulze – Minimoogs, Micromoog, Polymoog, Modular, Memorymoog
- Seeed
- Mark Shreeve of Redshift – modular
- Eric Siday first user in the sixties, used early modulars
- Shaggy
- Matt Sharp – Weezer, The Rentals
- Claudio Simonetti – Goblin, Daemonia
- Paul Shaffer – Late Show with David Letterman
- Tom Schuman – keyboardist from the jazz band Spyro Gyra used a Multimoog and Moog Liberation
- Paul Simon
- Skinny Puppy
- The Sleep-ins
- Snarky Puppy
- Józef Skrzek – leader of Polish group SBB
- Sniff 'n' the Tears
- The Sounds
- Soulwax
- Space Art used a Polymoog and a Memorymoog.
- Stereolab
- David Scott Stone
- Robert Jan Stips
- Scott Storch
- Suicide
- Sun Ra – An idiosyncratic Jazz innovator, recorded and played live with a prototype Minimoog in late 1969 and thereafter made extensive use of Moogs in his music
- SPOD – Minimoog
- Sunn O)))
- Supremes
- Chris Swansen - composer in residence and musical director with the R.A. Moog Company, in 1969 he gave the world premier of the instrument at the Museum of Modern Art in New York
- Syrinx Three-piece band from Toronto, Canada who recorded and toured 1970–1972 with John Mills-Cockell playing Moog and other synths
- Sylvan Esso
- Shalabi Effect
- Stephan Bodzin

== T ==
- Peter Townshend
- Tycho
- Richard Tandy – Electric Light Orchestra – Micromoog, Minimoog and Polymoog
- Tangerine Dream - 1973 to present day. Used customised IIIP x 2 (1973-1979), Minimoog (from 1975), Polymoog (from 1979), Memorymoog (from 1982), Minimoog Voyager (from 2011), Minitaur, Sirin, Mother 32 & DFAM
- Tegan and Sara – Minimoog
- Yann Tiersen
- That Dog
- Thursday
- Isao Tomita – Moog Modular 55 and Custom Modular synthesizers and Polymoog
- Tonto's Expanding Head Band
- Trentemøller
- Trocadero
- Roger Troutman – Zapp (band)

== U ==
- Ultravox – Notably the distinctive 'Vienna' bassline was performed on a Minimoog by Bassist Chris Cross
- The Units – Pioneers of electropunk, Scott Ryser played a Minimoog on all of their records beginning in 1979 and Rachel Webber played a Moog Source.

== V ==
- Eddie Van Halen
- Manuel Valera currently playing a Moog Little Phatty and Minimoog Voyager
- Anthony Cedric Vuagniaux
- Marián Varga

== W ==
- Adam Wakeman With Ozzy Osbourne, Black Sabbath & Strawbs
- Oliver Wakeman With Yes on the Fly From Here album
- Rick Wakeman
- Steve Walsh – Kansas
- Jeremy Wall - Minimoog Spyro Gyra
- Kit Watkins – Used a Minimoog with Camel in 1979 on "I Can See Your House from Here", also on solo album Labyrinth (1980)
- Whirlwind Heat
- Andy Whitmore Record Producer / Keyboard Player, London UK
- Alan Wilder – Recoil – Depeche Mode
- Ben Wilson – Blues Traveler
- Brian Wilson – On The Beach Boys Love You album
- Carl Wilson – On the Surf's Up album
- Dennis Wilson – On the Pacific Ocean Blue album
- Steve Winwood – With the Go band on their albums, Go and Go Live from Paris in 1976 and in his solo albums
- Peter Wolf – In Frank Zappa's band.
- Stevie Wonder
- Bernie Worrell – Keyboard player with Parliament, Funkadelic, and touring member with Talking Heads
- Fred Wreck – Hip hop producer (Snoop Dogg)
- Richard Wright – Pink Floyd – Used on The Dark Side of the Moon (1973), Wish You Were Here (1975), Animals (1977) and The Wall (1979)
- Klaus Wunderlich – Used a custom cabinet Moog modular system on the album Sound Moog 2000 Organ, Rhythm (1973)
- Gary Wright- Spooky Tooth and his solo career
- Zakk Wylde – Black Label Society, on the album Mafia

== Y ==
- Akira Yamaoka
- Yellow Magic Orchestra
- Adam Young – Owl City/Producer/Engineer, Owatonna MN
- Larry Young
- Yes
- Joey Youngman as Wolfgang Gartner

== Z ==
- Frank Zappa – had most of his keyboard players played a Minimoog in the '70s and '80s.
- Zero 7
- Hans Zimmer – Film composer
- Zolof the Rock & Roll Destroyer
- Zigmars Liepins – (Moog Prodigy)
- Zoot Woman
- Fred Zarr
