= Fear and the Nervous System (album) =

Studio album by Fear and the Nervous System
- Released: September 18, 2012 (digital download); August 21, 2012 (Japanese CD)
- Genre: Alternative metal
- Length: 47:05
- Labels: Emotional Syphon Recordings; GrindHouse Recordings (Japan)
- Producers: Tim Harkins, Danny Lohner

Singles from Fear and the Nervous System
- 1. "Choking Victim" Released: June 29, 2011

Fear and the Nervous System is the sole album by American rock band Fear and the Nervous System, released on September 18, 2012.

== Background ==
The project began in 2008 led by Korn guitarist James "Munky" Shaffer, who began writing for the band after the death of his father. In early 2008 he started gathering musicians for his project, starting with drummer Brooks Wackerman of Bad Religion and various other projects, followed by Korn's touring keyboardist Zac Baird, Faith No More bassist Billy Gould, and io echo guitarist Leopold Ross. After recording the music, Shaffer introduced producer Ross Robinson to the band's music, who contacted Steve Krolikowski of Repeater to provide vocals.

The first single, "Choking Victim", was released on June 29, 2011, as a free download from the band's website. Shaffer said of the song, "It's a good representation of what people will hear, and it's about something that happens to all of us. You trust somebody, give them your heart, and they turn around and stab you in the back. I think everybody can relate to that."

== Track listing ==
No.	Title	Length
1.	"Hell (Intro)"	2:04
2.	"Choking Victim"	3:27
3.	"Chosen Ones"	3:12
4.	"No Secrets"	4:50
5.	"Chinatown"	3:17
6.	"Beautiful Side"	4:22
7.	"Triggers"	4:25
8.	"Dissolve"	6:18
9.	"Jaguar"	3:46
10.	"Slow Motion"	3:48
11.	"Last Dive"	3:24
12.	"Ambien"	4:12

US CD bonus tracks
No.	Title	Length
13.	"The Combine"	6:03
14.	"Silvertone"	2:44

Japan CD bonus tracks
No.	Title	Length
13.	"Gelatin"
14.	"Silvertone"

== Band members ==
Musicians

- James Christian Shaffer – guitars
- Steve Krolikowski – vocals
- Leopold Ross – guitars, programming, production
- Zac Baird – keyboard
- Billy Gould – bass
- Brooks Wackerman – drums

Other contributors

- Wes Borland – album artwork
- Tim Harkins – production
- Danny Lohner – production
- Jim Monti – mixing
