= Evolution (Korn song) =

Single by Korn

from the album Untitled album
- Released: June 12, 2007
- Genre: Nu metal, industrial rock
- Length: 3:38
- Label: EMI; Virgin
- Songwriters: Reginald Arvizu; Zac Baird; Lauren Christy; Jonathan Davis; Graham Edwards; James Shaffer; Scott Spock
- Producers: Atticus Ross; Korn; The Matrix

Korn singles chronology
"Freak on a Leash (MTV Unplugged version)" (2007)	"Evolution" (2007)	"Hold On" (2007)

Alternative Cover

"Evolution" is a song by American nu metal band Korn. The song was the first single to be released from the band's untitled album on June 12, 2007. It is one of the four tracks in which Brooks Wackerman of Bad Religion performed drumming duties.

== Promotion ==
=== Music video ===
"Evolution", directed by Dave Meyers, was filmed on June 15, 2007 in Los Angeles. The music video features Slipknot drummer Joey Jordison, although the actual drum tracks were recorded by Brooks Wackerman. According to the casting call sheet, "Evolution" is "filled with political satire and humor." The production team sought mostly male actors to fill roles such as "hero scientists", religious politicians, doctors, green peace guys, anthropologists, military men, and "government types". Casting interviews were held June 12 and 13, 2007.

==== Plot ====
In the first part of the music video, fictional infographics demonstrate that the average human IQ has been in constant decrease since the 1950s, with this trend predicted to continue in the future, as high-IQ families have an average of 1.5 children while low-IQ families have an average of 5 children. Because of medical advancements and no natural predators, human population increases proportionally as it IQ decreases. Furthermore, the graphics show that the human brain is shrinking to 10% of its original capacity, which is less than a monkey's.

The second part shows scientists and politicians gathered in Washington, D.C. for the "Evolution Crisis Summit", where a thesis called "De-Evolution of Man", according to which humans will return to below-ape intelligent levels, is to be debated. After a video showing footage of humans and other simians in similar activities and positions, a researcher throws a ball to a naked man who fails to catch it and later throws the same ball to a chimpanzee who successfully catches it, astonishing the attendees, including a Catholic priest who vehemently denounces the De-Evolution thesis. In a last experiment, an assistant offers the chimpanzee a banana and a bunch of dollar bucks. The chimpanzee eventually chooses the banana, which leads the De-Evolution thesis to be rejected.

==== Viral marketing ====
The domain www.evolutiondevolution.com was set up in promotion of the song. The website is a spoof to promote the "Evolution" music video. It is themed as a documentary publication website and features Korn acting as "experts" who studied evolution in support of a fake documentary titled Devolution: Nature's U-Turn. Vocalist Jonathan Davis explained that the band wanted to try a different kind of promotion, and so created the website and several viral promotion trailers.

==== Theme controversy ====
In response to the fake trailer for Devolution: Nature's U-Turn, Devo member Gerald Casale wrote on www.clubdevo.com: "We denounce this as imposters [sic] playing with fire." According to Casale, fans of Korn thereafter sent him hate mail. Casale then explained that he would have appreciated if Korn had recognized Devo as pioneers of the concept. Korn vocalist Jonathan Davis responded, "Korn never claimed to be the first to expose De-Evolution, our hats are off to Devo for that."

=== Song debut ===
"Evolution" debuted on May 16, 2007 via Los Angeles radio station KROQ and the Korn Myspace page. During the song's debut, bassist Reginald Arvizu and guitarist James Shaffer were present in the radio station's studio. The song premiered live on May 20, 2007 at the KROQ-FM Weenie Roast y Fiesta in Irvine, California.

== Track listing ==
UK CD single

1. "Evolution" – 3:39
2. "Evolution (Dave Audé Remix)" – 3:41

Digital download

1. "Evolution (Explicit/Clean)" – 3:38

UK 7" vinyl

1. "Evolution" – 3:37
2. "I Will Protect You" – 5:29

US promo maxi-single

1. "Evolution (Harry Choo Choo's Evolution Remix)" – 8:53
2. "Evolution (Dave Aude Remix)" – 7:42
3. "Evolution (Dave Aude Club Dub)" – 7:25
4. "Evolution (Dave Aude Radio)" – 3:42
5. "Evolution (David Garcia + Margan Page Remix)" – 6:39
6. "Evolution (David Garcia + Margan Page Dub)" – 6:36

EU CD radio promo

1. "Evolution (Reverse Clean)" – 3:37
2. "Evolution (Super Clean)" – 3:38
3. "Evolution" – 3:39

UK promo CD

1. "Evolution" (Radio Edit)

== Chart performance ==
"Evolution" became Korn's fourth single to reach the top five on Billboard's Mainstream Rock Songs chart. It also peaked in the top twenty on Alternative Songs chart.

=== Charts ===
Chart (2007)	Peak position
Canada Rock (Billboard)	47
Czech Republic Rock (IFPI)	12
Finland Airplay (IFPI Finland)	12
France Radio (SNEP)	95
Latvian Airplay (LAIPA)	29
Scotland Singles (OCC)	28
UK Singles (The Official Charts Company)	114
UK Rock & Metal (OCC)	2
US Dance/Club Play Songs (Billboard)	18
US Alternative Songs (Billboard)	20
US Bubbling Under Hot 100 (Billboard)	7

== See also ==
- Devolution
- Dysgenics
