= Shane Gibson (musician) =

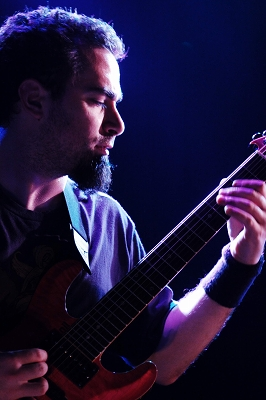

Background information
- Born: Shane Paul Gibson; February 21, 1979; Houma, Louisiana, United States
- Died: April 15, 2014 (aged 35) Birmingham, Alabama, United States
- Genres: Hard rock, thrash metal, industrial metal, progressive metal, nu metal, acoustic, experimental
- Occupation: Musician
- Instruments: Guitar, vocals, bass
- Label: Indie
- Formerly of: Echoes The Fall; Jonathan Davis and the SFA; Korn; Postcard Audio; SchwarZenatoR; stOrk
- Website: Official website

Shane Paul Gibson (February 21, 1979 – April 15, 2014) was an American musician best known for being the touring guitarist for the American metal group Korn, after the departure of Brian "Head" Welch in February 2005. He also played the lead guitar for the solo tour of Jonathan Davis from Korn.

He was hired on and joined forces in a project group called Mr Creepy. The band was formed by Arthur Gonzales who also brought in (studio musician) Michael G Clark, award-winning bassist/vocalist, Jasmine Cain, and ex-Black Label Society drummer, Mike Froedge.

His main band, stOrk, with Thomas Lang, singer VK Lynne and bassist Kelly LeMieux, is an experimental rock band that combined different elements, including thrash metal and progressive rock.

In 2010, he recorded the single "Free" with an American metal band, Echoes The Fall.

He appeared in a 2014 episode of the TBS prank show, Deal with It. The episode aired on May 21.

Gibson died on April 15, 2014, in Birmingham, Alabama, of complications from a blood clotting disorder.

== Personal life ==
Shane held a bachelor's degree in Music Performance and Music Therapy from Berklee College of Music.

== Discography ==
- 2005: As a solo artist – Mr. Stork
- 2007: Jonathan Davis and the SFA – Alone I Play
- 2009: L. Shankar – Face to Face
- 2009: Jason C. Miller – Last to Go Home
- 2010: SchwarZenatoR – SchwarZenatoR
- 2010: stOrk – stOrk
- 2010: New World Man – A Tribute to Rush ("New World Man", "Fly By Night", "Force Ten")
- 2010: Echoes the Fall – "Free"
- 2011: Jonathan Davis and the SFA – Debut solo album
- 2013: SchwarZenatoR - "Jingle All The Way" Single
- 2014: Mr Creepy - "Mr Creepy EP"
- 2014: stOrk – Broken Pieces
