= Alone I Play =

Live album by Jonathan Davis and the SFA
- Released: 10 November 2007
- Recorded: 7 November 2007 at Woodshed Recorder, Malibu, California
- Genre: Experimental rock; acoustic
- Length: 71:24
- Label: Invisible Arts
- Producer: Richard Gibbs

Jonathan Davis and the SFA chronology
Queen of the Damned Soundtrack Album (2002)	Alone I Play (2007)	Live at Union Chapel (2011)

Alone I Play is a live album by Korn vocalist Jonathan Davis, released on 10 November 2007. It was recorded and videotaped at Malibu's Woodshed Recorder on 7 November 2007, the day before Davis embarked on his first solo tour, the Alone I Play tour. The album was recorded and packaged in CD and DVD formats and prepared for sale in no longer than three days, where it is sold at venues where Davis performs (although a commercial release is planned).

Alone I Play features songs originally composed by Davis and Richard Gibbs for the 2002 film Queen of the Damned, as well as classic and uncommonly performed Korn songs. Despite the fact that this is a solo effort, three members of Korn's backup band appear on the album: keyboardist Zac Baird, guitarist Shane Gibson and percussionist Michael Jochum. The renowned and eclectic Indian violinist and composer L. Shankar also makes an appearance. The album's title is a pun on Korn's 2002 song "Alone I Break".

== Releases ==
=== Limited edition ===
Most copies of the limited edition were sold on the Alone I Play tour. However, the last six copies (often known as the super limited edition) were sold on eBay for charity.

The limited edition was the original release. It was quite different from the standard edition (a re-release that is being sold online for $25). It is quite rare, as only 1200 copies (including the six copies of the super-limited edition) were made. The CD content is the same as the re-release, but the packaging and DVD content is slightly different.

The front cover looks almost identical to that of the re-release, the only difference is that the limited edition does not have Jonathan Davis' name on the front cover. The back cover does not have the list of tour locations. There also isn't a barcode, because it was a tour release.

The inset of the case does not have a track list. Sometimes the page was signed by the band members. Included on the page is the copy number (for example: "1193/1200"). The DVD included special material not found on the re-release.

==== Super-limited edition ====
While shipping the original 1200 copy run of Alone I Play, Invisible Arts was short one box. They originally thought that it was caused by a shipping error. However, they found out that an international piracy consortium had stolen the final box. Invisible Arts tracked down the culprits and recovered the package in downtown Los Angeles. The recovery resulted in the creation of the 6 super-limited editions sold on eBay. They were sold for a minimum of $260.

This package came with a copy of the limited edition of Alone I Play, signed by all members of the band.

Another item in this package was a glossy photo of Jonathan Davis' solo band.

The third and final item in the package was a bonus CD including three tracks. The first two tracks aren't available on the CD or DVD (Blue Monday and The Chauffeur). The third track was available on the DVD, but not the CD (Falling Away From Me). Some people think that Love on the Rocks is on the bonus CD, but it isn't known for sure.

A portion of these sales went to charity.

For those who couldn't make the tour, or afford the super-limited edition, the Alone I Play CD/DVD set was re-released as a standard edition that can be purchased on the Invisible Arts site.

=== Standard edition ===
After all 1200 copies of the limited edition were sold (including the six sold in the super-limited edition), Invisible Arts re-released Alone I Play as a standard edition.

The layout is rather different from the limited edition. Jonathan Davis's name was added to the front cover, and his name was absent from the limited edition cover.

The back cover of the standard edition has the list of places where Jonathan Davis performed. There is also a barcode in the lower right-hand corner.

The inside of the case has a green inset, unlike the red inset the limited edition had. The inside panel that was blank on the limited edition has a track list on the standard edition. There were a few mistakes with the credits page on the limited edition, the standard edition had the errors fixed.

The CD is identical to the one on the limited edition. The DVD does not have the interviews with Richard Gibbs that the limited edition had.

== Track listing ==
1. "System" – 4:52
  - Queen of the Damned
2. "Last Legal Drug (Le Petit Mort)" – 5:15
  - Korn cover
  - See You on the Other Side bonus track
3. "4 U" – 2:48
  - Korn cover
4. "Hey Daddy" – 3:52
  - Korn cover
5. "Forsaken" – 3:42
  - Queen of the Damned
6. "Dirty" – 3:55
  - Korn cover
7. "Alone I Break" 4:20
  - Korn cover
8. "Slept So Long" – 5:38
  - Queen of the Damned
9. "Hushabye" – 4:35
  - Korn cover
10. "Kick the P.A." – 2:31
  - Korn cover
  - Spawn soundtrack
11. "Not Meant for Me" – 4:41
  - Queen of the Damned
12. "Hold On" – 3:05
  - Korn cover
13. "Careless (Akasha's Lament)" – 4:46
  - Unreleased track from Queen of the Damned
14. "Redeemer" – 4:16
  - Queen of the Damned
15. "Got the Life" – 3:43
  - Korn cover
16. "Trash" – 3:37
  - Korn cover
17. "Falling Away from Me – 4:00
  - Korn cover
  - DVD only
18. "Tearjerker" – 5:38
  - Korn cover
  - Track 17 on CD

=== DVD bonus features ===
- Interview with Jonathan Davis
- Interview with Richard Gibbs (only on the limited edition)

=== Super limited edition bonus CD ===
1. "Blue Monday" – 4:48
  - New Order cover
2. "The Chauffeur" 4:51
  - Duran Duran cover
3. "Falling Away From Me" – 4:00
  - Korn cover
10. "Love on the Rocks" – 3:43
  - Neil Diamond cover
  - Wonderland soundtrack

== Alone I Play Tour ==
=== USA set list ===
1. "System"
2. "Last Legal Drug"
3. "4 U"
4. "Hey Daddy"
5. "Forsaken"
6. "Dirty"
7. "Alone I Break"
8. "Slept So Long"
9. "Love on the Rocks"
10. "Hushabye"
11. "Kick the P.A."
12. "Shane Gibson v.s. Miles Mosley"
13. "Not Meant For Me"
14. "Hold On"
15. "Blue Monday"
16. "Queen of the Damned Score Medley"
17. "Careless"
18. "Redeemer"
19. "Got the Life"
20. "Trash"
21. "Falling Away From Me"
22. "The Chauffeur"

== Personnel ==
- Jonathan Davis – lead vocals, multi-instruments
- Shankar – violin, backing vocals
- Shane Gibson – guitar, backing vocals
- Zac Baird – keyboards, backing vocals
- Miles Mosley – electric double bass
- Michael Jochum – drums, percussion
