= L.A.P.D. (band) =

American funk metal band

- From left to right: David Silveria, James Shaffer, Reginald Arvizu, Richard Morrill

Background information
- Origin: Bakersfield, California, U.S.
- Genres: Funk metal
- Years active: 1989–1992
- Labels: Triple X, ANTI-
- Spinoffs: Korn
- Past members: James Shaffer; Reginald Arvizu; David Silveria; Richard Morrill; Derek Campbell; Troy Sandoval; Jason Torres; Kevin Guariglia

L.A.P.D. (Love and Peace Dude, later Laughing as People Die) was an American funk metal band formed in 1989 in Bakersfield, California. From 1989 to 1992, the member lineup was James "Munky" Shaffer, Reginald "Fieldy" Arvizu, David Silveria and Richard Morrill. The group has released one studio album, one extended play, and one compilation album.

The band was originally formed by Shaffer, Arvizu, and Morrill. Still in need for a drummer, the band placed an advertisement in a local newspaper which was answered by Silveria. Shortly after this, the band recorded a demo album which was meant to be sent out to record companies. Realizing they would have to continue the band in a more populated area in order for them to expand, all of the members but Shaffer left Bakersfield and resided in Hollywood, Los Angeles, California (Shaffer later moved to Hollywood as well). In late 1989, the band hired a man named Arthur as their manager, resulting in them getting signed to Triple X Records. The band recorded and released their first extended play in 1989, but it suffered from poor distribution.

In 1991, they released Who's Laughing Now, their first full-length studio album. After the release of their debut album, Morrill quit the band, and the rest of the group set out to form the band Korn. Several of the band's former members have formed solo projects. In 1997, a compilation album consisting of fourteen tracks was released. The band takes its name from the initials of the Los Angeles Police Department.

== History ==
=== Formation and early days (1989) ===
L.A.P.D. formed in Bakersfield, California, in 1989. The band was started with Richard Morrill, James Shaffer, and Reginald Arvizu. With both guitarist and bass guitar positions filled, there was still a need for a lead vocalist, as well as a percussionist. Richard Morrill was the only credited vocalist for L.A.P.D.

The band still needed a drummer, so they put an ad in a local newspaper. The ad description stated that they were a "funk, thrash, metal groove band looking for a drummer." This resulted in David Silveria auditioning for the band. Although at the time Silveria was only fifteen, he was still recruited to the band, filling the percussionist position. L.A.P.D. recorded a demo album consisting of four songs, "James Brown", "Stinging Like a Bee", "Jesus", and "Don't Label Me", which were all ready to be sent out to various record labels.

The group left Bakersfield and set out for Los Angeles, California. Shaffer was the only band member that was not in favor of the act. He was the only one to stay in Bakersfield, while all the other band members left. Silveria dropped out of high school to leave Bakersfield. Richard's mother Donna allowed the entire band plus 2 roadies to live with her in a 2 bedroom apartment in Burbank CA. L.A.P.D. began rehearsing at a space located in Hollywood, California, near Western Avenue. Shaffer decided to return to the band when he and his girlfriend broke up. Brian Welch, a guitarist who knew Shaffer and Arvizu when they were in high school (and who later joined the band when they reformed as Korn), would occasionally "check out the [band's] music scene."

=== Releases and breakup (1989–1990) ===
Who's Laughing Now was the band's second release and first studio album.

L.A.P.D. was performing at several gigs in Hollywood throughout their self-titled EP era. After one of their shows, a local and drumming protege of Gene Krupa known as Arthur Von Blomberg was positioned as manager. After the group was kicked out of their original studio for not paying the rent on time, they quickly found another practice space in Santa Monica, California. In 1990, their manager introduced them to Triple X Records, an independent Los Angeles based record company that has signed artists such as Dr. Dre, Social Distortion, Jane's Addiction, and The Vandals. The company offered them a contract after seeing them in concert. Bassist Arvizu described the contract as "pitiful", but L.A.P.D. still signed and began recording their album. According to Arvizu, the record company did not distribute the album properly. In 1989, the group released their first EP Love and Peace Dude through Triple X Records.

In 1991, L.A.P.D. recorded their second album, Who's Laughing Now. Released on May 3, 1991, it was their first full-length studio album, and consisted of eleven tracks. After they recorded the album, the group's lead vocalist, Richard Morrill, left L.A.P.D. and Bassist Arvizu wrote: "Richard Morrill quit L.A.P.D when he met his wife (m. 1993) Rania. So Munky [Shaffer], David [Silveria], and I had to start all over again." While looking for a new singer, they heard Jonathan Davis singing for the alternative metal band Sexart. After the show, the remaining band members of L.A.P.D. asked him to join their band. Shortly after this, the band changed their name to Korn and added Brian Welch to the lineup.

=== Post–breakup and subsequent projects (1992–2010) ===
The band continued on through Shaffer, Arvizu, and Silveria, who soon added Jonathan Davis as lead singer and Brian Welch as another guitarist. Bassist Reginald Arvizu, (now known better as "Fieldy") released a solo album entitled Rock'n Roll Gangster on January 22, 2002. In 2006, Fieldy formed the band StillWell with Q-Unique and P.O.D. drummer Noah "Wuv" Bernardo. Fear and the Nervous System is currently one of James Shaffer's (now known by band members as "Munky") side projects, formed in 2008. Aside from projects by the members of L.A.P.D., in 1997 a compilation album was also released. The album featured songs from both their EP, Love and Peace Dude, and their full–length studio album, Who's Laughing Now. In 2010, L.A.P.D. had a short revival when Morrill began playing with a new lineup that included Derek Campbell (guitar), Jason Torres (drums), Troy Sandoval (bass), and Kevin Guariglia (DJ) in Denver, Colorado. The group recorded a five-track demo that was never officially released but was posted on the band's social media pages. The group split in early 2011.

== Style and influence ==
The group considered themselves to be a "funk, thrash metal groove band" when they posted an ad in a Bakersfield newspaper. Bradley Torreano from AllMusic noted that the band was "a far different beast than what its members would move on to," while also saying it incorporated "elements of funk into their thrashy stew." Bassist Reginald Arvizu described L.A.P.D.'s music as being "very heavy", and also said that "audiences loved [them]."

L.A.P.D.'s art and visual imagery complemented the themes of their music and performance. The band members adopted a "baggy hip-hop street way of dressing". Bassist Arvizu had dreadlocks, and said that there "was absolutely nothing femme about [the band]."

When the band was first started, their lead vocalist introduced them to bands such as Red Hot Chili Peppers and Faith No More, and the group has since cited them as major influences to their musical style. The group is considered to have launched the careers of three members of the nu metal band Korn. Drummer David Silveria said that "L.A.P.D. really was good for us because we learned about the industry and how things work." Korn has influenced bands such as Slipknot, Saliva, Breaking Benjamin, Cold, and Flyleaf.

== Discography ==
Year	Title	Label	Type	Ref
1989	Love and Peace Dude	Triple X Records	Extended play	
1991	Who's Laughing Now	Triple X Records	Studio album	
1997	L.A.P.D.	Triple X Records	Compilation album	

== Members ==
Name	Years active	Position	Ref
James Shaffer	1989–1992	Guitar	
Reginald Arvizu	1989–1992	Bass	
David Silveria	1989–1992	Drums	
Richard Morrill	1989–1992	Vocals	

== See also ==
- List of Korn member solo projects
- List of funk metal bands
