= Whitey (band) =

- Origin: Denton, Texas
- Years active: 1989–1997

Whitey was an American band playing rock, funk and Latin styles from 1989 to 1997. Originating in Denton, Texas, Whitey was popular in the Dallas and Austin scenes including Deep Ellum and became known for its wild stage antics. They toured extensively throughout Texas, Oklahoma, Kansas, Louisiana, and Arkansas.

In 1993, Whitey was featured on the first Denton Discoveries CD, produced by Jack Griffis, owner of the Depot Beer Garden. This project laid the groundwork for the Denton Discoveries Foundation, an initiative created to support and promote local music talent.

In 1994, Whitey won the Dallas Observer music award for best funk/R & B group.

Whitey was formed in Denton in the early 1990s, the brain child of Corey Korn while playing in another Denton band called the Cowtippers. The original name was to be Kill Whitey (an ironic twist on a mainly white funk band), but Corey thought it might be too extreme and shortened it to Whitey.

In the early 1990s, the underground sounds of Denton bubbled to the surface and people noticed — albeit not for the first time, since Denton’s musical prowess is a cyclical phenomenon. The main clubs of Denton at the time — the Gravity Room, the Library and later Rick’s Place, The Depot Beer Garden — were hosting funk bands of the Goodfoot, Whitey, Billygoat and Ten Hands variety.

— The North Texan Observer

== Past band members ==
- Chris Veon (Catfish) - vocals, guitar
- Zac Baird (Zaphrodesiac) - vocals, keyboards
- Carl (Captain Carl) - vocals, keys
- Corey Korn (Fuzzy Bubba) - bass, vocals
- Andrew Barefoot (Speed Jesus) - bass
- Eric Korb (?) - guitar, vocals, trumpet
- David Willingham (Dr. Lovedaddy) - guitar
- Austin Castillo (Mr. December 27) - lead birthday
- Thad Scott (Neckbone) - saxophone
- Raul Vallejo (Rolo the Latin Lover) - trombone
- Fernando Castillo (Frog Leg) - trumpet
- William Brown (Bill 10") - Sax&10"
- J. Walter Hawkes (Pork Chop) - trombone
- Phill (Peanut) - drums
- David C (?) - percussion, drums
- Jesse (?) - drums
- Toby Sheets (Marijuanicus) - drums, percussion, vocals
- Mike (?) - drums
- Eric Hansen (Superfoot) - drums
- John Speice (?) - drums
- Go Go Ray (?) - drums
- Chris L (The Professor) - percussion, drums
- Laura Elizabeth Sinks (Magic Momma) - vocals
- Rebecca (Madame Miracle) - vocals
- Shawna (Sister Sunshine) - vocals
- Trey (?) - vocals
- J Rob (J Rob) - vocals
- Brit Davis (Duck Butter) - drums, percussion, dance

== Discography ==
=== Albums ===
- Whitey - 1992 (cassette)
- Up on the Deeper Still - 1994 (cassette)

=== Compilation albums ===
- Tales From The Edge - 1992 KDGE-FM (CD) Album Information
- Denton Discoveries - 1993 (CD)

=== Bootlegs ===
- Black Label Days - 1998 (CD)
