= Hold On (Korn song) =

Single by Korn

from the album Untitled album
- Released: October 8, 2007
- Length: 3:05
- Label: EMI; Virgin
- Songwriters: Reginald Arvizu; Zac Baird; Lauren Christy; Jonathan Davis; Graham Edwards; James Shaffer; Scott Spock
- Producers: Atticus Ross; The Matrix

Korn singles chronology
"Evolution" (2007)	"Hold On" (2007)	"Kiss" (2008)

Music video
- "Hold On" on YouTube

"Hold On" is a song written and recorded by American nu metal band Korn, The Matrix, and Atticus Ross for Korn's untitled eighth studio album. It was released as the album's second single in October 2007.

== Music and structure ==
Munky describes the song as "the closest thing to an original Korn song" on the untitled album. It is one of the four songs on the untitled album to feature Brooks Wackerman of Bad Religion on drums.

== Music video ==
The music video for "Hold On" features the band in a rodeo setting and with Munky and Jonathan Davis trying to "hold on" to their bulls in order to win a bullriding contest. The video is dedicated to the late bullrider Lane Frost, who died on July 30, 1989, as a result of injuries sustained after dismounting his bull.

=== Viral campaign ===
To promote the release of the video, several viral videos and an accompanying website were produced advertising "Ballsville Beef Parts", which featured the residents of Ballsville and the members of Korn playing various bullriders. One of these videos is a fake news interview with Davis, in character as J.D. Kornuto.

== Track listing ==
=== UK digital download ===
1. "Hold On" – 3:05
2. "Evolution (Dave Audé Remix)" – 7:38
3. "Sing Sorrow" – 4:35

=== German promo ===
1. "Hold On" – 3:03

== Charts ==
=== Weekly charts ===
Weekly chart performance for "Hold On"
Chart (2007–2008)	Peak position
Czech Republic Rock (IFPI)	9
Latvian Airplay (LAIPA)	39
US Alternative Airplay (Billboard)	35
US Mainstream Rock (Billboard)	9

=== Year-end charts ===
Year-end chart performance for "Hold On"
Chart (2008)	Position
US Mainstream Rock Songs (Billboard)	40
