= We Walk from Safety =

Studio album by Repeater
- Released: August 2011
- Recorded: Los Angeles, California, United States
- Genres: Post-hardcore; art rock; indie rock
- Labels: I Am Recordings; White Label Collective
- Producer: Ross Robinson

Repeater chronology
Patterns EP (2010)	We Walk from Safety (2011)

We Walk from Safety is the second full-length studio album from post-hardcore band Repeater, released in August 2011. It was the second collaboration between Repeater and producer Ross Robinson (the first being Patterns EP). The title of the album is taken from a song with the same name which appears on Repeater's 2005 demo.

== Track listing ==
No.	Title	Length
1.	"Yours And Mine"	5:53
2.	"Finally, A Place"	5:04
3.	"To Swallow Lost Goodbyes"	4:31
4.	"Patterns"	4:34
5.	"Black And Selfish Love"	4:54
6.	"Hold Back The Tide"	3:39
7.	"Knowing Every Weakness"	3:53
8.	"Is This The Last Time"	4:56
9.	"Keep The Sun From Rising"	4:26
10.	"The Stars Spell Out Your Name"	4:34
11.	"Arms Upon The Ground"	4:43

== Personnel ==
Musicians

- Steve Krolikowski (vocals and guitar)
- Rob Wallace (keyboards)
- Victor Cuevas (bass)
- Alex Forsythe (guitar)
- Matt Hanief (drums)

Technical

- Produced, engineered and mixed By Ross Robinson
- Mastered by Alan Douches

== Reception ==
The release of the album was highly anticipated. Like Radiohead's Rainbows album, 'We Walk From Safety' was released for a "Name Your Own Price."

The album was released to positive reviews. (3 out of 4) (Rating 7.2 out of 10) (8.5 out of 10)

The album was chosen as #1 Album Pick of the Year by Popblerd and Editor's choice for #1 Album of 2011 at Sicmagazine.
