= Iron Flowers =

Iron Flowers may refer to:

- Iron Flowers (Grey DeLisle album), 2005
- Iron Flowers (Repeater album), 2008
