= Venera (band) =

American experimental electronic music duo

- Origin: Los Angeles, California, U.S.
- Genres: Experimental; electronic; industrial; dark ambient
- Years active: 2022–present
- Labels: Ipecac; PAN
- Members: James "Munky" Shaffer; Chris Hunt
- Website: veneramusic.com

Venera is an American experimental electronic music duo formed in 2022 by Korn guitarist James "Munky" Shaffer and composer-producer Chris Hunt. Their music blends dark ambient, industrial, and electronic elements, characterized by layered textures and cinematic soundscapes.

== History ==
Venera was formed in Los Angeles following collaborative sessions between Shaffer and Hunt, who initially met while working with singer Xhoana X. The duo began developing a sound centered on sonic experimentation and atmospheric design, diverging from Shaffer's previous work in heavy metal.

Their self-titled debut album, Venera, was released on October 13, 2023, through Ipecac Recordings. The album featured contributions from several artists, including Jacob Duzsik of HEALTH, Alain Johannes, Rizz of VOWWS, and Deantoni Parks.

In July 2025, the group announced its second studio album, Exinfinite, scheduled for release on September 12, 2025, via the Berlin-based label PAN. The album includes guest appearances by FKA twigs (on "Caroline"), Chelsea Wolfe (on "All Midnights"), and Dis Fig (on "End Uncovered"). The lead single, "Tear", was released in July 2025 along with a visualizer.

== Musical style ==
Venera's style incorporates ambient, industrial, and electronic influences. The duo employs processed guitars, layered electronics, and percussive elements to construct dense, atmospheric compositions. Critics have noted the project's departure from Shaffer's earlier work in nu metal, emphasizing its experimental and cinematic character.

== Discography ==
=== Studio albums ===
- Venera (2023, Ipecac Recordings)
- Exinfinite (2025, PAN)

=== Selected singles ===
- "Swarm" (2023)
- "Hologram" (2023)
- "Ochre" (2023)
- "Tear" (2025)

== Members ==
- James "Munky" Shaffer – guitars, electronics (2022–present)
- Chris Hunt – production, percussion (2022–present)

== Critical reception ==
Venera has received coverage from multiple independent sources, including Consequence, Revolver, PopMatters, Stereogum, BrooklynVegan, and Metal Injection. Reviews have highlighted the project's experimental structure, sonic detail, and high-profile collaborations.
