= Motionless Hour (EP) =

EP by Repeater
- Released: June 26, 2007
- Genre: Rock
- Length: 16:20

Repeater chronology
Motionless Hour (2007)	Iron Flowers (2008)

Motionless Hour is the second release by Long Beach, California band, Repeater—their first, not including the 2005 demo. Coming from an eight-song session intended to be a full-length album, the band decided to split up the tracks and release two separate EPs. The second EP remains unreleased at this time.

Singer, Steve Krolikowski compares this album to Scary Monsters (And Super Creeps) by David Bowie.

== Track listing ==
1. "Diamond Ceiling" (4:52)
2. "Painless" (3:47)
3. "The Time Apart" (3:08)
4. "Carved in Shadows" (4:36)

== Personnel ==
- Steve Krolikowski (vocals and guitar)
- Rob Wallace (keyboards)
- Victor Cuevas (bass)
- Alex Forsythe (guitar)
- Matt Hanief (drums)
