= Who's Laughing Now (album) =

Studio album by L.A.P.D.
- Released: May 3, 1991
- Recorded: 1991
- Genre: Funk metal
- Length: 32:45
- Label: Triple X

L.A.P.D. chronology
| Love and Peace, Dude (1989) | Who's Laughing Now (1991) | L.A.P.D. (1997) |

Who's Laughing Now is the only full-length studio album by American funk metal band L.A.P.D., released in 1991. Songs from the album, along with the tracks from the band's first release, Love and Peace, Dude, also appeared on the 1997 compilation album L.A.P.D.

== Track listing ==
| No. | Title | Lyrics | Music | Length |
|---|---|---|---|---|
| 1. | "P.M.S." | Reginald Arvizu, James Shaffer | Arvizu | 5:14 |
| 2. | "Don't Label Me" | Arvizu | Arvizu | 5:06 |
| 3. | "St. Ides" | Arvizu, David Silveria | Silveria | 4:35 |
| 4. | "All My Life" | Shaffer, Stept | Shaffer, Silveria | 0:44 |
| 5. | "Who's Got the Number" | Shaffer, Silveria | Silveria | 2:31 |
| 6. | "Excuse Me" | Silveria, Gabriel, Hall | L.A.P.D. | 4:49 |
| 7. | "Listen (Do What I Say)" | Richard Morrill | Morrill | 3:29 |
| 8. | "Doe Tee Beat" | Arvizu | Arvizu, Silveria | 0:16 |
| 9. | "Slicky Slixter" | L.A.P.D. | Shaffer | 2:38 |
| 10. | "Place in France" | L.A.P.D. | Arvizu | 2:16 |
| 11. | "Number 7" | Arvizu | Morrill | 1:08 |
| Total length: | | | | 32:45 |

== Personnel ==
- Richard Morrill – vocals
- James Shaffer – guitar
- Reginald Arvizu – bass
- David Silveria – drums

Additional

- Valerie Hanna – vocals
- Vince Suzuki – saxophone
