= Monster in the Machine =

- Genres: Alternative rock
- Years active: 2007–2008
- Labels: Emotional Syphon Records
- Members: Shannon Crawford; John Chase; Jay Kuri; Lats
- Website: monsterinthemachine.com

Monster in the Machine was an American alternative rock band featuring Shannon Crawford (formerly of Cellophane) on vocals, keyboards and guitar, John Chase (also formerly of Cellophane) on guitar, Jay Kuri on drums and Lats (formerly of Memento) on bass.

Along with the band Droid, they were one of the first two acts signed to Emotional Syphon Recordings in 2006 when Korn guitarist James Shaffer started the independent label. Their first album released on August 21, 2007, was titled Butterfly Pinned. It featured guest spots from James Shaffer and Imani Coppola, while bassist Doug Ardito and drummer Josh Freese also contributed to the album. The lead single off the album was titled "Savior", for which they also released an official video. "Under Your Shadow" was the second and final single.

They've gone on to tour with other notable bands such as Team Sleep and Rockfour.

== Albums ==
=== Butterfly Pinned ===
Track listing

1. "Fear of the Mind" (3:29)
2. "Helicopter" (3:53)
3. "Perfect" (2:52)
4. "Under Your Shadow" (3:34)
5. "One Way Trip" (3:09)
6. "Savior" (2:46)
7. "Dot On My Soul" (2:41)
8. "Shut the Door" (featuring Imani Coppola on violin) (5:29)
9. "Dog (Interlude)" (1:42)
10. "Dog" (2:34)
11. "Burns Inside Me" (3:27)
12. "Don't" (featuring James Shaffer on guitar) (3:51)
