= Memorymoog =

Polyphonic analog synthesizer

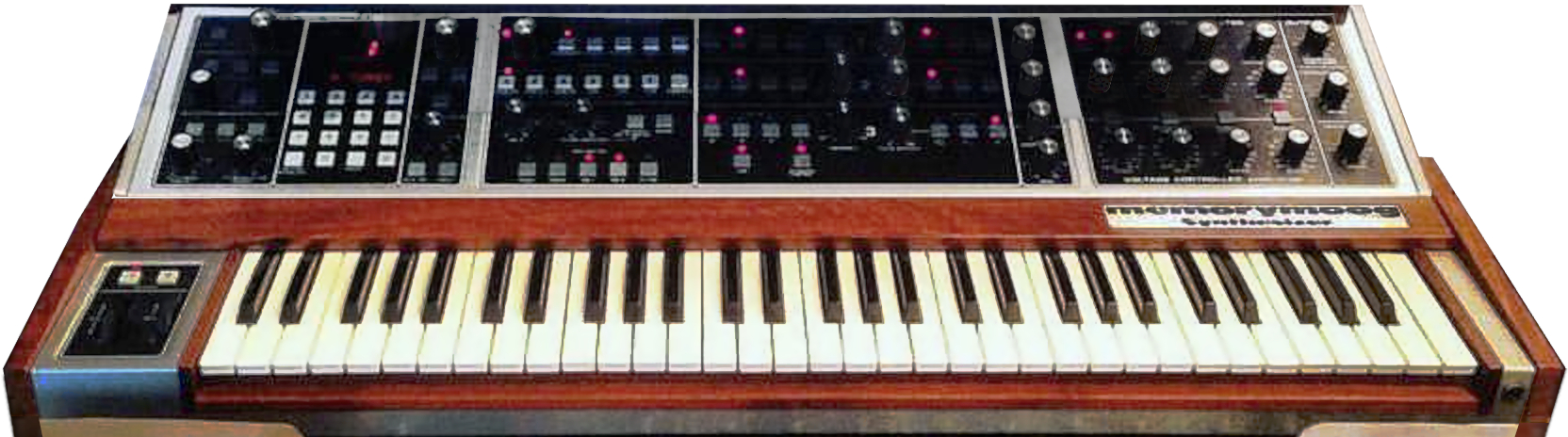
- Memorymoog
- Manufacturer: Moog Music
- Dates: 1982–85
- Price: US$4,795; UK£3,675

Technical specifications
- Polyphony: 6 voices
- Timbrality: Homogenous
- Oscillator: 18 VCOs (3 per voice) + Pink Noise (Digital)
- LFO: 1 dedicated, plus Osc 3
- Synthesis type: Analog Subtractive
- Filter: One 24dB/octave low-pass per voice
- Aftertouch expression: no
- Velocity expression: no (possible with aftermarket Lintronics Advanced Memorymoog upgrade)
- Storage memory: 100 patches, volatile (3.3v lithium battery backup)
- Effects: none

Input/output
- Keyboard: 61 keys
- Left-hand control: Pitch & Modulation wheels
- External control: CV/Gate, foot pedal & foot switch inputs, Program Chaining, Cassette Interface, MIDI (on “Plus” model)

The Memorymoog is a polyphonic electronic music synthesizer manufactured by Moog Music from 1982 to 1985, the last polyphonic synthesizer to be released by Moog Music before the company declared bankruptcy in 1987. While comparable to other polyphonic synthesizers of the time period, such as the Sequential Circuits Prophet-5 and Oberheim OB-Xa, the Memorymoog distinguished itself with an additional, 3rd audio oscillator per voice and greater preset storage capacity.

== Overview ==
While the earlier Polymoog synthesizer (1975) featured unlimited polyphony via divide-down technology, the 6-voice Memorymoog was the first polyphonic Moog to feature dedicated oscillators and filters for each voice. It is often described architecturally as six Minimoogs in one unit. Each of the six voices of the Memorymoog is made up of 3 voltage-controlled oscillators that can be set to any combination of pulse (variable width), saw, and triangle waveforms and freely switched over a 4–octave initial range. Each voice also has its own 24 dB/Octave Low Pass voltage-controlled filter. Moog Music wisely included a discrete implementation of its famed, patented transistor ladder filter, which was first introduced in the Moog Modular systems of the 1960s and subsequently came into widespread prominence in the Minimoog. In Mono mode, the Memorymoog functions as a traditional monophonic synthesizer with 1–18 oscillators selectable in unison for powerful leads and basslines. The user may also specify any combination of Low-, Latest- or High-Note Priority keying and Single or Multiple Triggering, for an impressive degree of control. A Chord Memory function (for single key, parallel chord "planing" effects) and an Arpeggiator are also included, while an independent LFO with 5 non-mixable waveforms allows simultaneous modulation of each VCO frequency, oscillator pulse width and filter cutoff frequency in any combination. Further, as on the Minimoog, VCO-3 can also be used as a Low- or Audio-Frequency modulation source. With careful programming, audio frequency modulation using Oscillator 3 can produce convincing pseudo-acoustic and FM-like timbres typically not associated with analog subtractive synthesis.

== Voicing ==
The Memorymoog uses Curtis CEM 3340 IC's as opposed to the discrete Moog oscillators used in the Minimoog and Modular units. With 18 oscillators, 6 voices, the Moog VCF and subtle on-board overdrive via the Mixer section, the instrument has a massive sound all its own and is capable of dominating the mix in which it is used.

== In use ==
Due to its complex analog architecture, the Memorymoog has been historically prone to certain reliability problems, and subsequently developed a reputation for non-roadworthiness. However, several factory updates - most notably the AutoTune Upgrade, which increases the "capture range" of the autotune circuit, allowing the instrument to tune itself more successfully – have made the Memorymoog a far more reliable instrument. Physically, the Memorymoog was extremely well constructed utilizing solid walnut cabinetry – again a nod to its Minimoog heritage - and brushed aluminum front/rear panels.

== Versions ==
Shortly after its initial release of the Memorymoog, Moog Music introduced the Memorymoog Plus (or Memorymoog+) as a replacement. The Plus featured a factory-installed MIDI interface – making it amongst the very first electronic instruments to include a MIDI implementation – and a basic polyphonic and monophonic sequencer, the latter of which is used to control an externally interfaced monophonic synthesizer (via rear panel CV/gate/trigger jacks). The "Plus" MIDI/Sequencer package was also available from Moog Music as a field or factory retrofit for original "non-Plus" Memorymoogs. Much discussion has centered around the comparative playability and sonic differences between the Plus and Non-Plus Memorymoogs; notably, some Non-Plus owners insist that the original units are superior to the Plus model, as the on-board Zilog Z80 microprocessor reportedly has difficulty keeping up with the added demands of the MIDI/Sequencer circuitry, resulting in discernible latency and attack smearing.

Moog also produced about 100 Memorymoogs re-branded with the name Sanctuary at the request of David VanKoevering, a longtime friend of Robert Moog and a Moog Music marketing evangelist. The Sanctuary was marketed to churches and Christian music groups.

== Upgrades ==
In 1992, the German company Lintronics, in association with the then Bob Moog-owned company Big Briar, introduced the Lintronics Advanced Memory Moog upgrade (LAMM), an extensive rebuild of the original hardware and software of both stock Memorymoog versions, with claims of far greater reliability and tuning stability, achieved mainly through replacement of critical voice card components, the notoriously failure-prone multi-pin connectors, and many other parts.

This upgrade also introduces a significantly improved MIDI implementation over the original MIDI-capable version, the Memorymoog Plus, which included only Note On/Off and Program Change in their original MIDI implementation, allowing the LAMM to respond to key velocity when controlled via MIDI. It further adds full MIDI control of virtually all front-panel controls, as well as MIDI sync for the arpeggiator and new arpeggiator modes.

It also adds the ability to mix the various LFO waveforms.

New 1/4” jacks are fitted for audio input to the filter and stereo outputs with fixed panning for each of the six voices.

The sequencer is removed from the stock Memorymoog Plus during this upgrade.

Since Lintronics replaces the entire CPU with a newer part and adds a new operating system, this obviates any concerns regarding perceived higher latency of Plus models over the original version.

As part of the idea behind the LAMM is to pre-empt any hardware issues that might arise over time, the upgrade has been expanded dramatically over the years, as experience with failing components has led to their being added to the standard replacement list. A LAMM upgrade from 1992, or even 2005, is thus not comparable to one performed in 2015.

As of 2020, the LAMM upgrade included replacement of over 1700 parts and required ca. eight weeks of workshop time.

== Notable users ==
French duo Space Art used a Memorymoog during the recording of their second album, Trip in the Centre Head.

Jan Hammer used the Memorymoog for much of his early work on the television series Miami Vice.

Geoff Downes of Asia on their second album Alpha and the subsequent tour in 1983.

Jon Lord on his solo album Before I Forget, with Whitesnake and Deep Purple studio and on stage.

Jim Gilmore of Saga from 1982 to 1985.

David Bryan of Bon Jovi throughout the early - mid 80s.

== See also ==
- Moog synthesizer
- Robert Moog
- Moog Music
- List of Moog synthesizer players
