= Jonathan Davis and the SFA =

American rock band

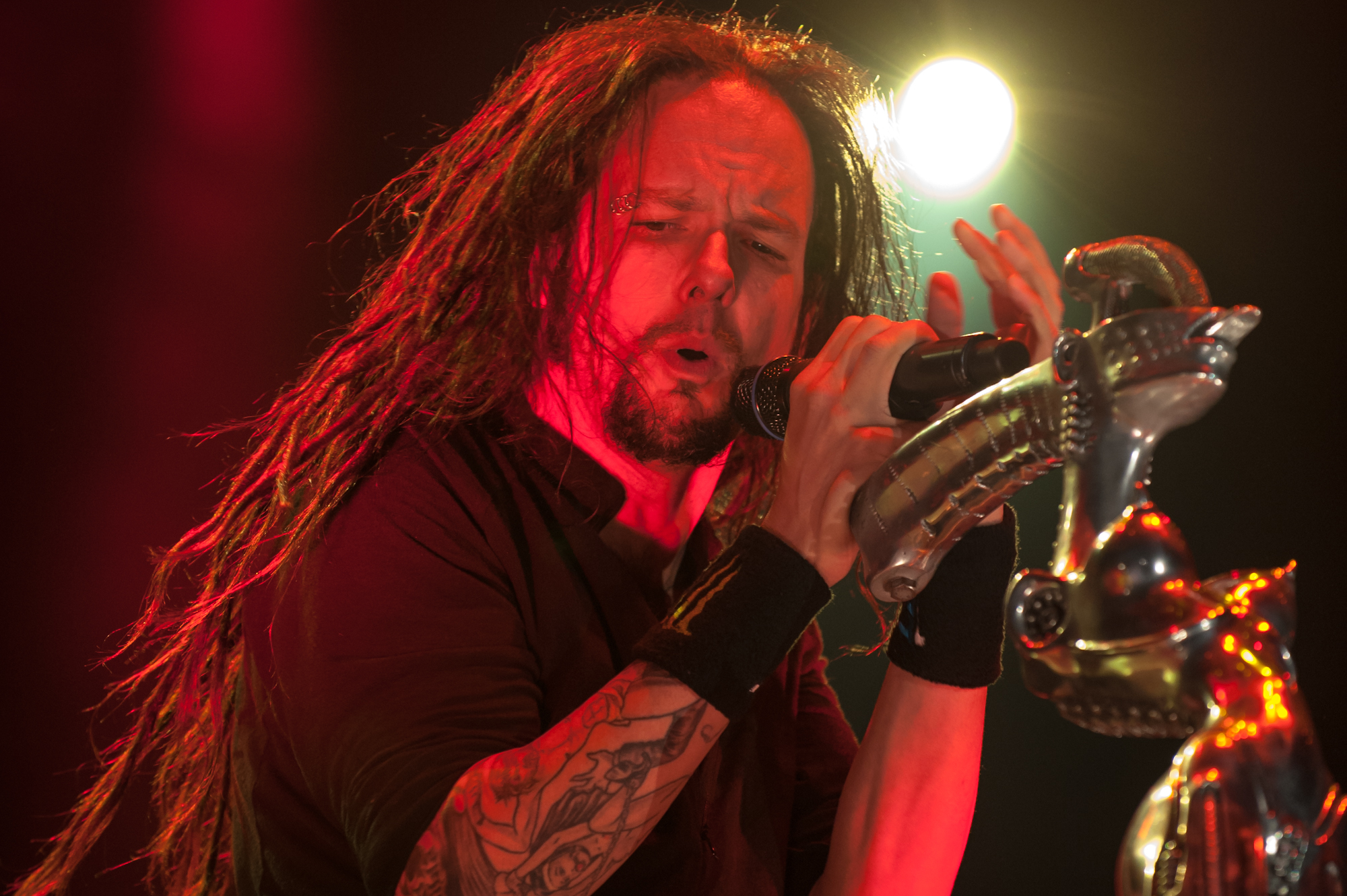
- Jonathan Davis performing in 2012

Background information
- Origin: United States
- Genres: Alternative rock; electronic rock; experimental rock
- Years active: 2007–2014
- Past members: Jonathan Davis; Miles Mosley; L. Shankar; Zac Baird; Ray Luzier; Michael Jochum; Shane Gibson

Jonathan Davis and the SFA (Simply Fucking Amazings) was an American alternative rock band, formed as a side project for Korn frontman Jonathan Davis. The band functioned as a musical collective, with a rotating cast of musicians involved with the project centred around Davis' songwriting. Although the project never officially released any studio material, two live albums were released in the time the band was active: Alone I Play in 2007, and Live at the Union Chapel in 2011.

== History ==
In 2007, following the release of the untitled Korn album, Davis formed the SFA as his first project in earnest outside of Korn. Davis' bodyguard and assistant, Loc, is believed to have come up with the name. The band went on their first tour of the United States in November 2007, followed by a European tour in May 2008. The band used their official website and a Ustream webcast to preview several demos from their upcoming album. Working titles include "Basic Needs", "Medicate", "Happiness", " Final Days", "Russia", "August 12", and "Gender", which was previously said to have been inspired by Buffalo Bill and Silence of the Lambs. The band also recorded 3 other untitled demos. Davis expressed interest with working with famed English producer Guy Sigsworth on the SFA album. Korn drummer Ray Luzier was involved with the recording of the album, as was percussionist Mike Dillon and Black Light Burns/Limp Bizkit guitarist Wes Borland. Their debut album was planned for a release sometime in 2011, with a North American tour expected to follow. This, however, did not eventuate.

A cover of Lil Wayne's "Got Money", featuring guitarist James Root (Slipknot and Stone Sour), was made available for free download on the band's official website. The release was accompanied by a message from Davis to "download the track I've been remixing the past few days. It's not representative of the album I'm working on but it was just something fun I wanted to try."

According to MTV News, select songs on Jonathan Davis and the SFA's debut had been co-written by acclaimed songwriting team, The Matrix, who had previously worked on Korn's 2005 album, See You on the Other Side.

In January 2011, Jonathan uploaded three full-length songs from the album on SoundCloud: "Medicate", "Happiness" and "Final Days".

In April 2014, guitarist Shane Gibson died following complications from a blood clotting disorder.

In December 2017, Davis confirmed that his debut solo album was to be released in 2018. He also stated that the SFA was no more, having dissolved the band after the death of Shane Gibson.

Black Labyrinth was ultimately released on May 25, 2018 solely under Davis' name, but featuring contributions from the SFA band musicians.

== Members ==
- Jonathan Davis – lead vocals, multiple instruments (2007–2014)

=== The SFA ===
Jonathan Davis stated on his webcast that the SFA was an ever-changing lineup of musicians. Some musicians were listed as "on break", as they never officially "quit" the SFA, but were not working with the band at the time. Michael Jochum was relieved of his duties after relocating to Denver, Colorado to be closer to his family.

- Shenkar – double violin, backing vocals (2007–2014)
- Miles Mosley – contrabass, occasional keyboards, backing vocals (2007–2014)
- Ray Luzier – drums, percussion (2008–2014)
- Wes Borland – session guitars (2008)
- Michael Jochum – drums, percussion (2007–2008)
- Shane Gibson – acoustic guitar, backing vocals (2007–2014; his death)
- Zac Baird – keyboards, backing vocals (2007–2014)

== Discography ==
=== Live albums ===
List of live albums
Title	Album details
Alone I Play	Released: November 10, 2007; Label: Invisible Arts; Formats: CD, digital download
Live at the Union Chapel	Released: August 16, 2011; Label: eOne; Formats: CD, digital download
