= Patterns (EP) =

EP by Repeater
- Released: July 14, 2010
- Recorded: Los Angeles, California, United States
- Genre: Rock; Indie rock
- Label: I Am Recordings; White Label Collective
- Producer: Ross Robinson

Repeater chronology
Iron Flowers (2008)	Patterns (2010)	We Walk From Safety (2010)

Professional ratings
Review scores
Source	Rating
Blogcritics	not rated
[sic] Magazine	8.2/10
It's All Indie	8.7/10
LA Weekly	not rated
Movies Music Mayhem	not rated

Patterns is a 3-song EP by Long Beach, California band, Repeater. This EP was produced and mixed by Ross Robinson (At The Drive-In, Korn, The Cure) and mastered by Alan Douches. It has been well-received by reviewers.

== Track listing ==
1. "Patterns"
2. "Keep The Sun From Rising"
3. "To Swallow Lost Goodbyes"

== Personnel ==
- Steve Krolikowski (vocals and guitar)
- Rob Wallace (keyboards)
- Victor Cuevas (bass)
- Alex Forsythe (guitar)
- Matt Hanief (drums)

=== Technical personnel ===
Produced, engineered and mixed By Ross Robinson
Mastered by Alan Douches
