= Moog Source =

Monophonic analog synthesizer

Source
- Moog Source (front panel)
- Manufacturer: Moog Music
- Dates: 1981 - 1985

Technical specifications
- Polyphony: Monophonic
- Timbrality: Monotimbral
- Oscillator: 2
- LFO: 1
- Synthesis type: Analog subtractive
- Filter: low-pass
- Storage memory: 16 patches

Input/output
- Keyboard: 37 keys
- Left-hand control: pitch wheel; mod wheel
- External control: CV/Gate

The Moog Source is a monophonic Z80 microprocessor-controlled analog synthesizer manufactured by Moog Music from 1981 to 1985. The Source was Moog's first synthesizer to offer patch memory storage. The design was also the first (and only) Moog synthesizer to feature a flat-panel membrane keyboard to replace the standard buttons, knobs and sliders, along with multihued panel graphics that were very different from anything Moog offered at the time.

== Capabilities ==
In addition to the memory capable of holding 16 presets, the Source features a 37-note keyboard, and two VCOs that can be selected among three waveforms and three octaves. Programmed presets can be saved to an audio cassette interface to free up the onboard memory for additional new patches. The 24 dB/octave VCF has parameters for keyboard tracking, cutoff frequency, resonance, and envelope amount. There are two fully analog ADSR envelope generators that can be set in single or multi trigger modes, one for the VCF and one for the VCA. For modulation, the Source features LFO and sample and hold. The unit also features a rudimentary sequencer. The Source was made in at least 2 versions the latter offering more voltage control options. After market modifications offers the addition of MIDI, increased memory, and other functions.

== Notable users ==
- Matt Sharp of The Rentals The instrument was used extensively on their album Return of the Rentals, as well as subsequent albums.
- Devo The Source was used on their 1981 album New Traditionalists, and the band also appeared in early print ads for the keyboard.
- Jon Lord
- Toby Smith, keyboard player of Jamiroquai
- Andy Fletcher of Depeche Mode used it extensively during their tours from late 1981 to mid 1983
- New Order, especially on the track "Blue Monday", for which it provides the throbbing bassline heard throughout the song.
- Harvey Bainbridge
- Matthew Seligman, bass player for Thomas Dolby, he also prominently used The Source on his EP "Sendai" (with Jan Linton)
- Minoru Mukaiya, keyboard player for Casiopea
- Front 242, used on their 1982 album Geography
- Randy Stern on Cameo's 1982 Alligator Woman LP
- Damon Albarn
- Michael Omartian
- Peter Baumann

== See also ==
- Moog synthesizer
- Robert Moog
- Moog Music
- List of Moog synthesizer players
