= Big Drum Bonanza =

Annual drumming event

- Genre: Rock, jazz, metal, country, progressive
- Locations: Los Angeles, California
- Years active: 10
- Founders: Elizabeth Lang
- Organizer: Muso Entertainment
- Website: www.bigdrumbonanza.com

Founded in 2012, The Big Drum Bonanza is an annual music and drumming educational event in the United States. From 2012 to 2019 the event was hosted by drummer Thomas Lang, and featured drummers, artists and special guests included Virgil Donati, Kenny Aronoff, Chris Coleman, Dave Elitch, Jim Keltner, Stanton Moore, Simon Phillips, Tony Royster Jr., Luis Conte, Matt Garstka, Gergő Borlai, John Tempesta, Luke Holland, Don Lombardi, Chad Wackerman, Derek Roddy, and Gregg Bissonette among other.

Hosted near Los Angeles, California, the event featured the "Big Drum Bonanza Theme Song Playalong Contest" which garnered submissions from 27 countries. The event allowed attendees to "play along" with well-known professional artists on their own practice drumset.

In 2022, Big Drum Bonanza founder, and CEO of Muso Entertainment, Elizabeth Lang partnered with Modern Drummer magazine to merge the Big Drum Bonanza festival with the Modern Drummer Festival. Celebrating its 20th anniversary in 2020, the Modern Drummer festival has featured concerts and performances from drummers including Dave Weckl, Steve Gadd, Billy Cobham, Chad Smith, Mike Portnoy, Gregg Bissonette, Todd Sucherman, Stewart Copeland, Carmine Appice, Vinnie Appice, Kenny Aronoff, Peter Erskine, Rick Allen, Alex Gonzales, Bobby Rondinelli, Rick Latham, Tony Verderosa, Jonathan Joseph, Nicko McBrain, Rick Allen, Russ Miller, Giovanni Hidalgo, Brendan Buckley, Rob Silverman, Jotan Afanador, Liberty DeVitto, Mike Portnoy, Steve Smith, Taylor Hawkins, and Cindy Blackman-Santana. In 2020, the Modern Drummer Festival honored the late Rush drummer and lyricist, Neil Peart by naming the first recipients of the Neil Peart Spirit of Drumming Scholarship, which was presented via video by Peart's widow Carrie Nuttall-Peart.

== See also ==
- List of drummers
