= StOrk =

American rock band

stOrk
- Origin: Los Angeles, California, U.S.
- Genres: Avant-garde metal, progressive metal, mathcore, instrumental rock, djent
- Years active: 2009–2014
- Label: MUSO Entertainment
- Past members: Shane Gibson; Eloy Palacios; VK Lynne; Thomas Lang; Kelly LeMieux

stOrk was an American avant-garde metal supergroup, formed by ex-Korn touring guitarist Shane Gibson and drummer Thomas Lang in 2009. The band's debut album, stOrk, was released on January 11, 2009, via MUSO Entertainment. Their second album, Broken Pieces, was released in 2014.

On April 15, 2014, Shane Gibson died of a blood clotting disorder at the age of 35.

== Band members ==
- Thomas Lang – drums, keyboards (2009–2014)
- Shane Gibson – guitars, vocals (2009–2014; his death)
- Eloy Palacios – bass (2009–2013)
- Kelly LeMieux – bass (2013–2014)
- VK Lynne – Vocals (2013–2014)

== Discography ==
- stOrk (2009)
- Broken Pieces (2014)
