= Billy Goat (band) =

American band

- Billy Goat, 1992. L-R: Mike Dillon, Kim Pruitt, Earl Harvin, Phil Major, Brandon Smith and Kenny Withrow.

Background information
- Origin: Denton, Texas
- Years active: 1989–1997
- Labels: Third Rail Records, Mercy Records

Billy Goat was a band playing rock, funk and Latin styles from 1989 to 1997 that frontman Mike Dillon later described as "a funk-punk band in the vein of the Red Hot Chili Peppers". Originating in Denton, Texas, Billy Goat was popular in the Dallas and Austin scenes including Deep Ellum and became known for its wild stage antics. One published reason for disbanding was turmoil caused from a tour van crash. Putting music ahead of antics, the band reformed with a new line-up in Kansas City prior to the 1995 release, Black and White. The more recent project of Dillon, Go-Go Jungle, has ties to Billy Goat's second incarnation including band members Go-Go Ray and J.J. Richards.

== Band members ==
- Mike Dillon – percussion, vocals (1989–97)
- Kim Pruitt – dance, vocals (1989–97)
- Philip Andrew Major AKA "Phillygoat" – guitar, vocals
- Kenny Withrow – guitar
- Brandon Smith – bass, vocals
- Earl Harvin Jr. – drums
- Sydney Madden – guitar, vocals (1993–97)
- Zac Baird – keyboards, vocals (1993–96)
- Eric Korb – guitar (1989)
- Mike Malinin – Drums (1989)
- Seth Moody – bass, vocals
- Steve Roehm – drums
- John Hawes - bass
- Jack Hooten - guitar
- Jonas Shelton – guitar
- J.J. Richards – bass (1994–97)
- Go-Go Ray – drums (1994–97)

== Discography ==
- Bukie 1990
- Bush Roaming Mammals 1992
- Live at the Swinger's Ball 1994
- Black and White 1995
