= Untitled Korn album =

Untitled

Studio album by Korn
- Released: July 31, 2007
- Recorded: October 2006 – March 2007
- Genres: Industrial metal; alternative metal; nu metal
- Length: 48:47
- Labels: EMI; Virgin
- Producer: Atticus Ross

Korn chronology
MTV Unplugged (2007)	Untitled (2007)	Korn III: Remember Who You Are (2010)

Singles from Korn II
- 1. "Evolution" Released: May 17, 2007; 2. "Hold On" Released: October 8, 2007; 3. "Kiss" Released: April 7, 2008; 4. "Haze" Released: April 22, 2008

The untitled eighth studio album by American nu metal band Korn was released on July 31, 2007, by Virgin Records. It is the band's only studio release without an official drummer, released between the departure of David Silveria in 2006 and the arrival of Ray Luzier in late 2007. Vocalist Jonathan Davis played drums on a few songs, and also hired drummers Terry Bozzio and Brooks Wackerman as session musicians. The album was intentionally released without a title, as Davis reasoned, "Why not just let our fans call it whatever they wanna call it?" Critical reviews were mixed, and the album was certified gold in the United States on October 30, 2007, substantially below their previous records.

== Background information ==
This album was the first without former drummer David Silveria, instead, Korn enlisted the help of Terry Bozzio, Brooks Wackerman, as well as Jonathan Davis for drumming. Also, the band recruited Zac Baird as keyboardist on this album. An MTV article published on May 17, 2007, includes an interview with Munky as he details the process of the new studio album, while also revealing several song titles. On May 28, vocalist Jonathan Davis joined Dutch radio station 3FM immediately after his performance at the Pinkpop Festival. He commented on the band's upcoming album, stating it "will not be titled." He elaborated, "We had the world's greatest drummer Terry Bozzio in and Brooks Wackerman from Bad Religion in and I played drums on some songs too. I'm so proud of it, we just can't wait to show people what we've done." Davis went on to say "We didn't want to label this album. It has no boundaries. It has no limits and why not just let our fans call it whatever they wanna call it?"

Musically, the album was described as more experimental and atmospheric than previous releases by the band.

=== Terry Bozzio's contributions ===
After successfully recording six tracks with Bozzio, Zac Baird announced that Bozzio would not be touring with the band on the Family Values Tour 2007. Jonathan Davis claims "things just got weird [with Bozzio]." Brooks Wackerman of Bad Religion was brought in to record some tracks, and even Jonathan Davis himself contributed, something not done since 1999's Issues. Munky stated in an interview that Bozzio had imposed himself on the band, and had demanded to be a full member of the band while receiving 25% interest. The band felt this request was "offensive", therefore, Korn declined to tour with Bozzio. Joey Jordison of Slipknot would tour with Korn on the Family Values Tour, along with the Bitch We Have a Problem Tour.

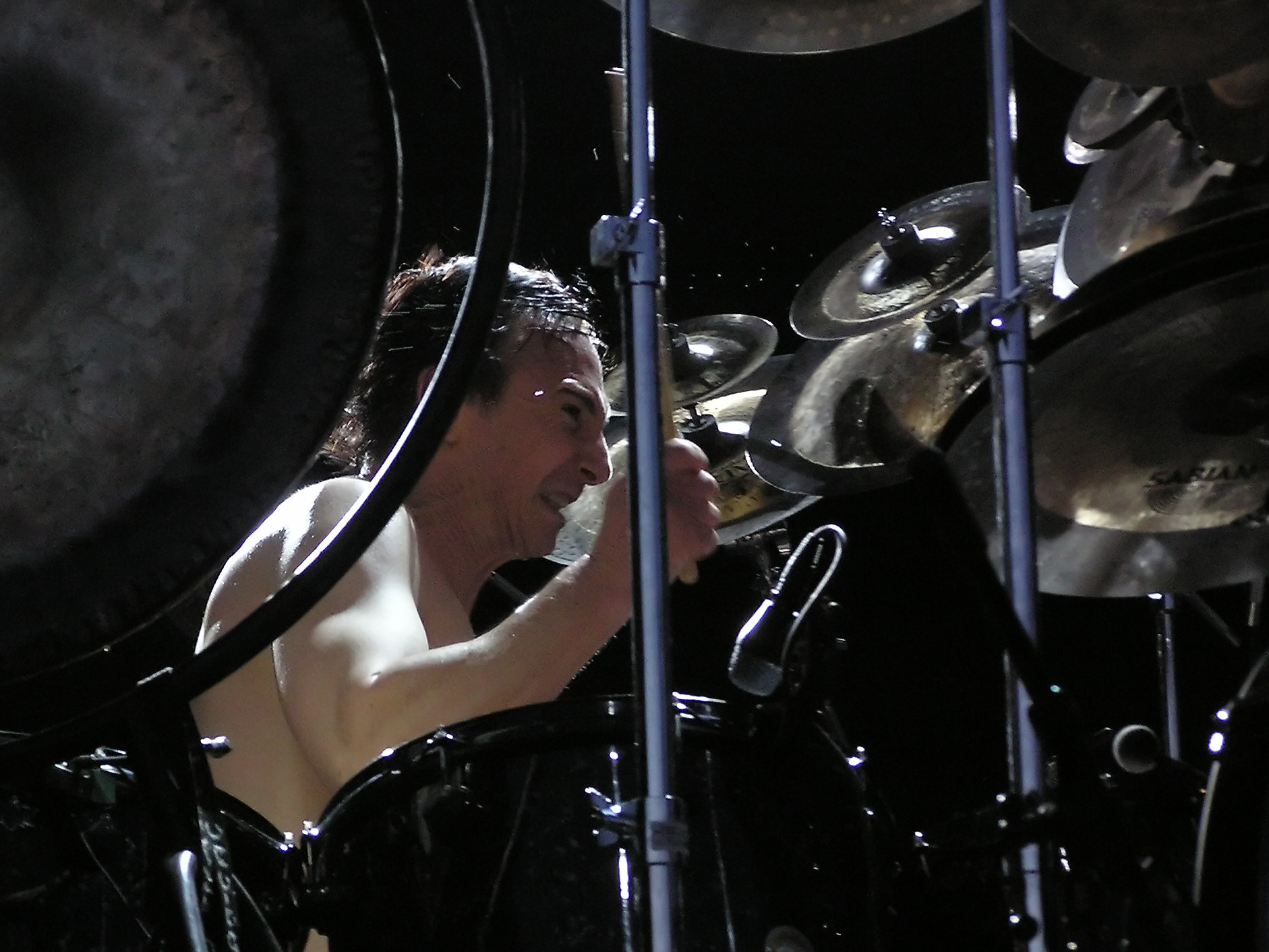
This album features drummer Terry Bozzio, formerly of Missing Persons and Frank Zappa.

=== The Matrix's departure ===
When premiering the single "Evolution" on KROQ on May 16, 2007, guitarist Munky noted that the band re-recorded much of the Matrix's tracks with Atticus Ross because of the band being dissatisfied with how the material had turned out. This was later confirmed in a Reuters/Billboard article:

This time around, amid some changes—founding drummer David Silveria is on hiatus to become a restaurateur, and The Matrix left the project early in the recording process—the band has crafted perhaps its most musically serious work since 2002's Untouchables. On the album's 13 tracks, Korn balances every chorus with murky keyboard atmospheres and toying arrangements, with songs that deeply explore a mood before exploding into a frenzy.

== Release ==
The album was released through EMI/Virgin in various territories, starting on July 27, 2007. The band ventured on the trio's Family Values Tour 2007 several days prior to the release and toured in support of the new record. The deluxe edition contains the bonus track "Sing Sorrow" (which follows the thirteenth track, "I Will Protect You"), a bonus DVD containing behind-the-scenes footage, hundreds of never-before seen photos of the band. The album debuted at number 2 on the Billboard 200, the highest since Untouchables. The untitled album sold 123,000 copies in its first week. It also fell off the charts within twelve weeks, accumulating twenty weeks altogether. In the United States, this is the most recent Korn album to receive any sort of certification from the RIAA.

- July 27, 2007 – Germany
- July 30, 2007 – United Kingdom, Mexico
- July 31, 2007 – United States, Canada
- August 8, 2007 – Japan
- October 14, 2007 – Vietnam, Philippines, Singapore
- December 18, 2007 – United Arab Emirates

=== Singles ===
The single "Kiss" was the third single released to promote the album on April 7, 2008. It features Terry Bozzio on drums, who had provided for eight of the album's songs. Jonathan Davis also provided additional percussion for the song, along with "Hushabye". The song makes use of keyboards by Zac Baird, heavy drum patterns and violins. AllMusic described "Kiss" as "like [a] vaguely Beatlesque Mellotron," implying its difference from the rest of the album.

The fourth single taken from the album, "Haze", was written and recorded for the first-person shooter video game Haze. It was released as a digital single on April 22, 2008. The game itself was released in May 2008 for the PlayStation 3. Korn posted a blog entry on April 23, 2008, stating that those who purchased their untitled album would be able to download "Haze" as a free VBR-quality MP3 by visiting a certain website. "Haze" was featured as a bonus track on the Enhanced Edition and the Australian re-release of their untitled album.

Ubisoft and Korn created a video mashup contest on April 28, 2008. The fans of Haze and the fans of Korn were given the opportunity to design the official video for "Haze". The winners were chosen on June 13, 2008, and the user "bootsrfun" on gametrailers.com was the first-place winner, which meant his entry was the official "Haze" video. There were also second-place, third-place, fourth-place and fifth-place winners.

== Critical reception ==
Professional ratings
Aggregate scores
Source	Rating
Metacritic	51/100
Review scores
Source	Rating
AllMusic	2/5 stars
Blender	3/5 stars
Entertainment Weekly	(B+)
IGN	8/10
New York Daily News	(mixed)
The New York Times	7/10
NME	5/10
PopMatters	4/10
Q	3/5 stars
Rolling Stone	2.5/5 stars

According to the review aggregator Metacritic, Untitled received "mixed or average reviews" based on a weighted average score of 51 out of 100 from 16 critic scores. The most positive reviews coming from IGN, The Gauntlet, and Billboard. IGN noted that, "There's an overall cohesion from start to finish, and repeated listens continue to reveal new and intriguing elements at every turn, which bodes well for the future", while The Gauntlet wrote, " 'Untitled' is the most articulate recording the band has delivered to date." Entertainment Weekly also praised the album as being the band's best release "since 1999's 'Issues'".

On the contrary, AllMusic critic Stephen Thomas Erlewine noted that the band is going through a "middle-age slump" and that the album "doesn't break them out of it." Rolling Stone asserted that Korn sounds "wounded and diminished", while PopMatters agreed, calling it "tired, bland and dated... merely going through the motions rather than creating honest music."

== Track listing ==
No.	Title	Writer(s)	Length
1.	"Intro"	Korn	1:57
2.	"Starting Over"	Korn, Atticus Ross, Zac Baird	4:02
3.	"Bitch We Got a Problem"	Korn, The Matrix, A. Ross, Baird	3:22
4.	"Evolution"	Korn, The Matrix, Baird	3:37
5.	"Hold On"	Korn, The Matrix, Baird	3:06
6.	"Kiss"	Korn, A. Ross, Leo Ross, Baird	4:10
7.	"Do What They Say"	Korn, The Matrix, A. Ross, L. Ross, Baird	4:17
8.	"Ever Be"	Korn, The Matrix, Terry Bozzio, Baird	4:48
9.	"Love and Luxury"	Korn, The Matrix, Baird	3:00
10.	"Innocent Bystander"	Korn, The Matrix, Baird	3:28
11.	"Killing"	Korn, The Matrix, Bozzio, Baird	3:36
12.	"Hushabye"	Korn, The Matrix, Baird	3:52
13.	"I Will Protect You"	Korn, The Matrix, Bozzio, Baird	5:29
Total length:			48:47

Limited edition CD box set bonus track
No.	Title	Length
14.	"Sing Sorrow"	4:35
Total length:		53:22

iTunes and 2023 vinyl deluxe edition bonus tracks
No.	Title	Length
14.	"Sing Sorrow"	4:35
15.	"Overture or Obituary"	3:02
Total length:		56:20

European and Australian enhanced versions
No.	Title	Length
14.	"Haze"	2:47
15.	"Hold On" (Video)	3:33
16.	"Hold On" (Video Trailer #1 The People of Ballsville Love Ballsville Beef Party)	1:01
17.	"Hold On" (Video Trailer #2 T.V. Commercial for Ballsville Beef Party)	0:30
18.	"Hold On" (Video Trailer #3 Dark Stranger's Personal Message to Ballsville Beef Party)	0:30
19.	"Hold On" (Video Trailer #4 Ballsville Channel 3 News, Last Interview with JC Kornato)	1:12
20.	"Hold On" (Video Game Trailer)	0:30
Total length:		58:50

Japanese edition bonus track
No.	Title	Length
14.	"Evolution (Dave Garcia + Morgan Page Remix)"	6:36
Total length:		55:23

MP3 download from official Korn fan club
No.	Title	Length
1.	"Once Upon a Time" ("Sing Sorrow" with alternate lyrics)	4:35

Deluxe edition bonus DVD

- Making-of documentary
- Korn photo slideshow

== Personnel ==
Korn

- Jonathan Davis – vocals, bagpipes, drums on "Bitch We Got a Problem" and "Love and Luxury", additional drums on "Kiss" and "Hushabye"
- James "Munky" Shaffer – guitar, lap steel guitar
- Reginald "Fieldy" Arvizu – bass

Additional musicians

- Terry Bozzio – drums on "Intro", "Starting Over", "Kiss", "Do What They Say", "Ever Be", "Killing", "I Will Protect You", and "Sing Sorrow"
- Brooks Wackerman – drums on "Evolution", "Hold On", "Innocent Bystander", and "Hushabye"
- Zac Baird – keyboards, organ, synthesizer

Mixing

- Terry Date – mixing on "Evolution", "Do What They Say", "Innocent Bystander", and "I Will Protect You"
- Alan Moulder – mixing on "Starting Over", "Hold On", "Kiss", "Ever Be", and "Love and Luxury"

A&R

- Peter Katsis – A&R
- James Bryant – A&R, A&R coordination, art consultation

Technical personnel

- Atticus Ross – producer, mixing on "Intro" and "Bitch We Got a Problem"
- Korn and The Matrix (Lauren Christy, Graham Edwards, Scott Spock) – production
- Jim "Bud" Monti and Frank Filipetti – recording, engineering
- Doug Trantow – additional engineering, mixing on "Intro" and "Bitch We Got a Problem"
- Stephen Marcussen – mastering for Marcussen Mastering, Hollywood, CA
- Stewart Whitmore – digital editing
- Leopold Ross – production assistant
- Jeff Kwatinetz – executive producer, exclusive management for The Firm
- Jeff Katsis – exclusive management for The Firm
- John Branca, Gary Stiffelman and David Byrnes – legal representation for Ziffren, Brittenham, Branca, Fischer, Gilbert-Lurie, Stiffelman and Cook, LLP
- Larry Einbund and Bill Vuylsteke – business management for Provident Financial Management
- Darryl Eaton and Rick Roskin – booking agents for Creative Artists Agency
- Nikki Hirsch – product management
- Sean Mosher-Smith – art direction and design
- Richard Kirk – artwork
- Chapman Baehler – photography

== Charts and certifications ==
Album

Chart (2007)	Peak position
Australian Albums Chart	11
Austrian Albums Chart	3
Belgian Albums Chart (Flanders)	28
Belgian Albums Chart (Wallonia)	17
Canadian Albums Chart	5
Czech Albums (ČNS IFPI)	5
Danish Albums Chart	20
Dutch Albums Chart	32
European Albums (Billboard)	3
Finnish Albums Chart	2
French Albums Chart	8
German Albums Chart	3
Greek Albums (IFPI)	1
Irish Albums Chart	31
Italian Albums Chart	19
Mexican Albums Chart	11
New Zealand Albums Chart	3
Norwegian Albums Chart	24
Polish Albums Chart	23
Scottish Albums Chart	18
Spanish Albums Chart	55
Swedish Albums Chart	17
Swiss Albums Chart	9
UK Albums Chart	15
UK Rock & Metal Albums (Official Charts)	1
US Billboard 200	2
US Billboard Top Rock Albums	1
US Billboard Top Hard Rock Albums	1
US Billboard Top Alternative Albums	1
US Billboard Tastemaker Albums	2

=== Certifications ===
Region	Certification	Certified units/sales
Russia (NFPF)	Gold	10,000^{*}
United States (RIAA)	Gold	500,000^{^}
^{*} Sales figures based on certification alone.^{^} Shipments figures based on certification alone.

Singles

Year	Song	US Alt.	US Main.	US Dance	CZE Rock	LAT	UK	US Active Rock (Billboard)
2007	"Evolution"	20	4	18	12	29	114	—
2007	"Hold On"	35	9	—	9	39	—	—
2008	"Kiss"	—	—	—	—	—	—	39
2008	"Haze"	—	—	—	—	—	—	—
