= Iron Flowers (Repeater album) =

2008 rock album by American band Repeater

Studio album by Repeater
- Released: Jun 1, 2008
- Recorded: Bomb Shelter Studios, Los Angeles, California, United States
- Genre: Rock; Indie rock
- Label: Document
- Producer: Chris Fudurich

Repeater chronology
Motionless Hour EP (2007)	Iron Flowers (2008)	Patterns EP (2010)

Professional ratings
Review scores
Source	Rating
Blogcritics	(not rated)
[sic] Magazine	(8.2/10)

Iron Flowers is the first full length release by Long Beach, California band, Repeater. This eight-song album was recorded at Bomb Shelter Studios in Los Angeles, California. It was recorded in 3 days and produced by Chris Fudurich.

== Track listing ==
1. "A Second Home"
2. "Missing"
3. "Carved in Shadow"
4. "The Gifted and the Damned"
5. "Killing Without Question "
6. "The Time Apart"
7. "No Single Lover"
8. "Last Conscience"

== Personnel ==
- Steve Krolikowski (vocals and guitar)
- Rob Wallace (keyboards)
- Victor Cuevas (bass)
- Nate Wainscott (guitar)
- Matt Hanief (drums)

=== Technical personnel ===
Produced, engineered and mixed By Chris Fudurich
