= Steve Krolikowski =

American singer-songwriter

- Born: Steve Krolikowski; Scottsdale, Arizona, United States
- Genres: Rock, art rock, pop
- Occupations: Musician, singer-songwriter
- Instruments: Vocals, guitar, piano, keyboards, synthesizers,
- Years active: 2001–present
- Label: IAM Recordings
- Website: repeaterband.com

Steve Krolikowski is an American musician who has provided lead vocals for three notable bands, The Main Frame, Repeater, and the supergroup Fear and the Nervous System.

== Career ==
=== The Main Frame ===
The Main Frame was a dark wave band from Long Beach, California formed in 2001 by Steve Krolikowski (vocals and guitar), Rob Wallace (keyboard), Bill Dungs Roman (bass) and Vaughn Klemz (drums). Vaughn Klemz was replaced by Trip Waterhouse in 2003.

In 2002, the band recorded Skull EP, followed by a full-length album, Curse of Evolution (2003) and a second unreleased EP, Beat To Death EP (2004). The band dissolved in 2005. After the band's dissolution, two songs from their unreleased EP appeared on IFC's American Gun. Krolikowski and Wallace went on to form the band, Repeater.

=== Repeater ===
Repeater released their first demo in 2005, followed by Motionless Hour EP in 2007 and their full-length album, Iron Flowers in 2008. Both Motionless Hour and Iron Flowers were released through the band's own Document Records.

=== Work with Ross Robinson (2010) ===
In 2010, the band was discovered by renowned producer, Ross Robinson. Robinson produced the band's next EP called Patterns, as well as their second full-length album, We Walk From Safety. The band released Patterns EP as a joint-release through I AM Recordings and their newly created White Label Collective.

Almost 2 years after the actual recording, the full-length album, We Walk From Safety is set to be released August 2, 2011.

=== Fear and the Nervous System ===
Krolikowski, having met members of Korn during the band's recording sessions with Ross Robinson, was selected to provide vocals for James Shaffer's side project and supergroup, Fear and the Nervous System along with Leopold Ross (guitars, programming, production), Zac Baird (keyboard), Billy Gould (bass) and Brooks Wackerman (drums).

The album is set for a 2011 release. On June 29, 2011 the song "Choking Victim" was released for free download from the official Fear and the Nervous System website.

Picture grey

He provided vocals for the Slovenian alternative rock band called Picture grey.
