= Thomas Lang =

Austrian drummer (born 1967)

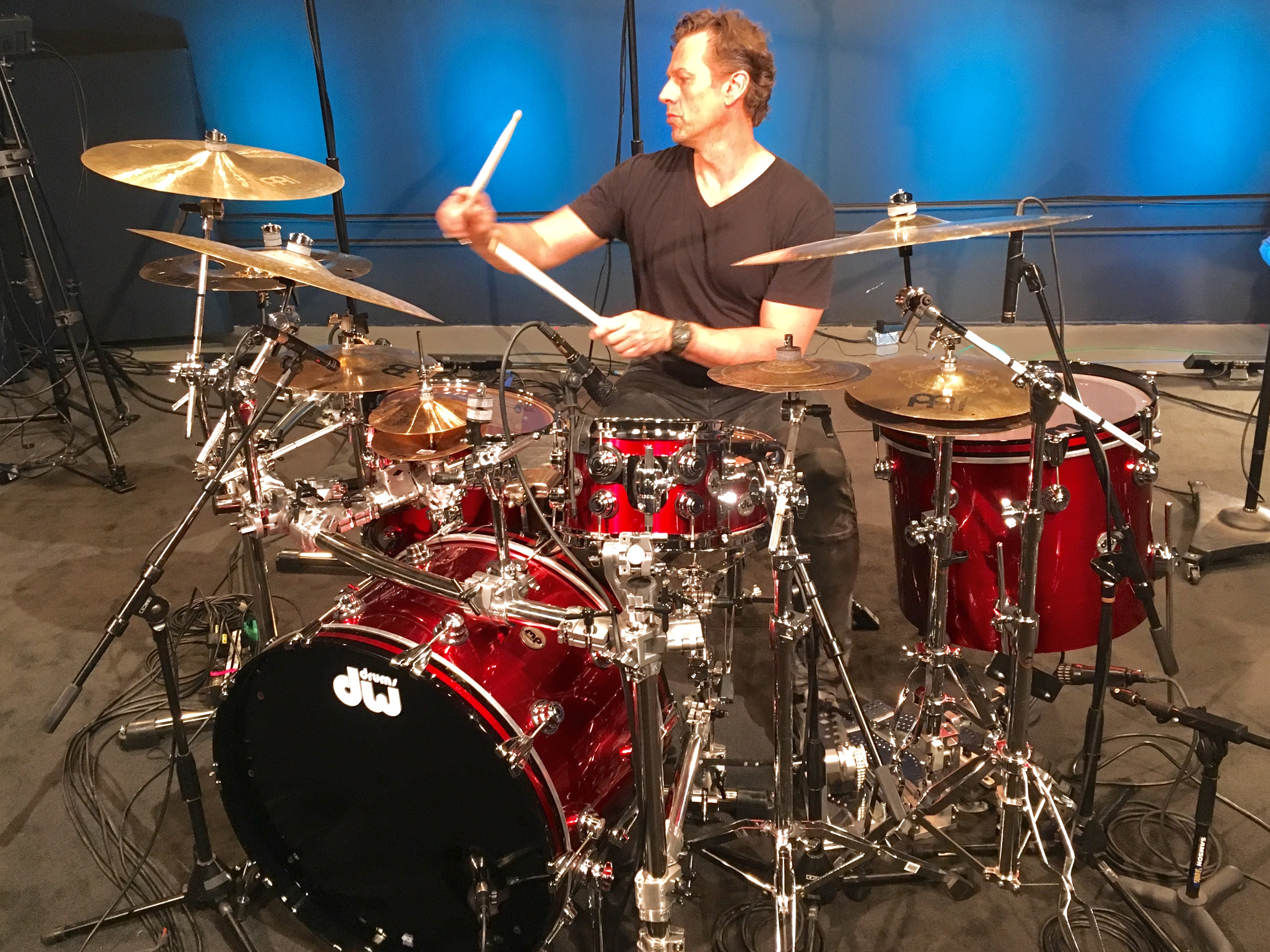
- Lang performing in 2018

Background information
- Born: 5 August 1967 (age 59); Vienna, Austria
- Genres: Instrumental rock, pop, jazz fusion, progressive rock, heavy metal, avant-garde metal
- Occupation: Musician
- Instrument: Drums
- Years active: 1985–present
- Spouse: Elizabeth Lang (married 2002-2023)

Thomas Lang (German: [ˈtoːmas laŋ]; born 5 August 1967) is an Austrian drummer. He is the founding member of the Los Angeles–based progressive/avant garde metal band stOrk and is known for his international session work on a wide variety of genres such as rock, pop, jazz, and heavy metal with artists such as Robert Fripp, and Sugababes, among many others.

Peter Wildoer described Lang as a "drummer's drummer", and Mike Portnoy cited Lang as a drummer he "can't replicate".

== Biography ==
Thomas Lang, a native of Stockerau, Austria took up drumming at the age of 5. In addition to lessons at local music schools and years of private tuition, he was classically trained at the Vienna Conservatory of Music. After leaving the conservatory in 1985, Lang began working professionally, working his way through the European pop, rock and jazz scenes. After leaving Vienna for London, England in 1990 Thomas started working his way through the global music scene.

As a session musician he has played for artists such as Paul Gilbert (Racer X/Mr. Big) John Wetton (Asia/King Crimson), Nik Kershaw, Sugababes, Geri Halliwell, Ronan Keating, Steve Hackett, 911, Boyzone, Falco, Nina Hagen, Bill Liesegang, Steve Jones, the Commodores, George Michael, Doogie White, B*Witched, Gianna Nannini, Lighthouse Family, Westlife, the Blockheads, Sertab Erener, Schwarzenator, Vinnie Valentino, Page Hamilton, Marc Bonilla (Montrose), Greg Howe, Jens Lindemann, Vienna Art Orchestra, Bonnie Tyler and Nadine Beiler.

In 1995, Lang released his debut solo project, Mediator, which garnered positive reviews under its original release with Koch Records. The record was released by Muso Entertainment Records in 2005 without Lang's cover of Frank Zappa's "Black Page." He has since released multiple solo albums and collaborations including Save The Robots, Something Along Those Lines (2002), Yumaflex (2008), StOrk (2009), StOrk "Broken Pieces" (2013), Robo Sapiens (2018) and Progpop (2019).

== Educator and author ==
Lang's original practice-regime eventually became the basis for his 2-part series of instructional videos Ultimatives Schlagzeug Part I and II, which were originally released in 1995. These videos were re-released in 2004 by Hudson Music. In 2003, Lang released the instructional DVD and book "Creative Control." In November 2006 Lang released the DVD and book "Creative Coordination And Advanced Foot Techniques". The three DVD and book set are based around multi-pedal orchestrations, independence, sheer power and advanced foot technique.

In 2007, Muso Entertainment launched the Thomas Lang Drumming Boot Camp, a multi-day touring, educational drumming experience that he has hosted in various locations around the world including London, Los Angeles, New York, Berlin, Austria and Finland, among others. Lang has since taken this award-winning educational concept to 35 countries and has hosted more than 120 of these camps worldwide. In 2011, Lang's wife, Elizabeth Lang launched the annual Los Angeles–based The Big Drum Bonanza under the Muso Entertainment banner with Thomas Lang serving as host of the five-day, multi-drummer festival that has featured guest artists like Virgil Donati, Stanton Moore, Chris Coleman, Dave Elitch, Kenny Aronoff, George Kollias, and Jeff Hamilton, among others. He was one of the seven drummers who auditioned to replace Mike Portnoy in Dream Theater.

Thomas is a frequent guest tutor at universities, drum seminars and drum camps all over the world. Lang also owns an online drum school "Thomas Lang's Drum Universe"

Lang also plays keyboards, bass, and guitar. He currently resides in Los Angeles, California.

== Solo performer and clinician ==
In 2004, Lang completed the largest drum clinic tour the world had ever seen (220 clinics in 48 countries). Lang has appeared multiple times at the most prestigious drum festivals on the planet over the past 20 years, including the Modern Drummer Festival, Australia's Ultimate Drummer's Weekend, PASIC, DRUM Night, Laguna Beach Drum Fest, La Roja Drum Festival, The Meinl Drum Festival, The Ultimate Drum Experience, Seoul Drum Fest, Sacheon Drum Fest, Opole Drum Festival.

== Selected discography ==
- Willi Langer – Colours of the Octopus (1993)
- Willi Langer – Signs of Life
- Thomas Lang – Mediator (1995)
- Billy Liesegang – No Strings Attached (1996)
- John Wetton – Live at the Progfest L.A. (1997)
- John Wetton – Arkangel (1997)
- John Wetton – Live in Tokyo (1998)
- B*Witched – Jump Up Jump Down Live (2000)
- Vienna Art Orchestra – Songs and other Adventures
- Vienna Art Orchestra – Art and Fun(2002)
- John Wetton – Live in Argentina (2003)
- Thomas Lang – Creative Control (2003)
- Thomas Lang – Creative Coordination (2006)
- Thomas Lang – Something Along Those Lines (2007)
- Thomas Lang/Conrad Schrenk – Yumaflex (2008)
- stOrk – stOrk (2009)
- Paul Gilbert – Vibrato (2012)
- stOrk – Broken Pieces (2014)
- Bastian – Among My Giants (2015)
- Eric Gillette – The Great Unknown (2016)
- Paul Gilbert – I Can Destroy (2016)
- Theo van Niel Jr. – Practised Bravado (2017)
- Ostura – The Room (2018)
- Arch Matheos – Winter Ethereal (2019)
- Thomas Lang – ProgPop (2019)
- Chris Turner – Triggered (2022)
- Nick Johnston – Child of Bliss (2023)
- Mads Aasvik – The Cartographer (2026)

== 2018 equipment ==
"My signature sticks – since I've had those I've felt really comfortable with my playing – that's one less worry. I really feel that they are perfect for me and my style of playing. Also, my signature cymbals – a lot of signature products are basically tools that make playing easier for me as well as more enjoyable."

Thomas has been an endorser of DW Drums since 2009. He uses Meinl Cymbals, including his own signature Fast Hi Hats, Generation X Filter Chinas, Custom Classics Super Stack and an array of Generation X crash cymbals. He has a Vic Firth signature drumstick. He also endorses Remo drumheads, Roland V-Drums & Electronics, Ahead Armour Cases, Puresound Snare Wires, Audix Microphones, Hansenfutz practice pedals, Drumtacs mufflers and Tuner Fish lug locks.

=== Drums ===
Drum Workshop Maple Mahogany in Solid Black Lacquer Custom finish with Black Nickel hardware and LUX leather bass drum hoops.

- 1× 24″ × 14″ Bass Drum
- 1× 20″ × 16″ Gong Drum
- 1× 14″ × 14″ Snom
- 1× 10″ × 5″ 10+6 Maple Snare Drum on STM Suspension Mount
- 1× 12″ × 6.5″ Snare Drum
- 1× 10″ × 5,5″ MT1055 Snare Drum
- 4x 6" Maple Rata Toms (sometimes substituted for Design Series Piccolo Toms)

=== Hardware ===
- 1× MCD Double Bass Drum Pedal
- 2× MCD Hi Hat (no legs)
- 1× 5000 series Snare Drum Stand
- 4× 9000 series Boom Cymbal Stands
- 1× 9000 series Drum Throne with 15" seat
- 1× X Hat with clamp
- 2× Boom cymbal holders & Multi Clamps
- 1× Meinl 18" Percussion Table
- 1× TL Custom DW Rata Tom/Pedal rack
- 1x DWSM2141X Hi Hat to Bass Drum Clamp

=== Drumheads ===
- Remo Emperor Clear on Snare Drums & Snom
- Remo Powerstroke 3 Clear on Bass Drum
- Remo Emperor Clear or CS Dot Clear on Rata Toms
- DW Coated Clear on Gong Drum

== Influences ==
Lang cites Neil Peart, Ian Paice, Stewart Copeland, Vinnie Colaiuta, Tony Williams, Ringo Starr, Buddy Rich, John Bonham, Phil Rudd, Alphonse Mouzon, Lenny White, Billy Cobham, Peter Erskine, Omar Hakim, Max Roach, Jack DeJohnette as some of his major influences.

== See also ==
- List of drummers
