= Anthony Cedric Vuagniaux =

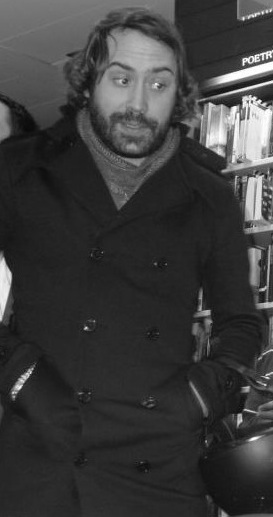
- Anthony Cedric Vuagniaux, Geneva, 2011

Background information
- Also known as: Tony Snake
- Born: 27 April 1977 (age 49); Geneva, Switzerland
- Genres: Film music, Electronic, Experimental, Pop
- Occupations: Soundtrack composer, music video director
- Instrument: Multi-instrumentalist
- Labels: Melodiastre, Plombage Records
- Website: https://www.anthonycedricvuagniaux.com

Anthony Cedric Vuagniaux (born April 27, 1977 in Geneva, Switzerland,) is a multi-instrumentalist composer. He is the founder of Plombage Records and produces his own movies.

Anthony Cedric Vuagniaux has been described in media sources as an "Unidentified flying object" of cinematography and electronic music. He writes, performs, records, mixes, and masters his compositions in his studio with rare musical instruments of all ethnicities, synthesizers, organs and old analog tape recorders.

== Biography ==
At the age of six, Anthony Cedric Vuagniaux falls on his father's old synthesizer. That day, he discovers a great fascination for sounds. His mother subscribes him to the Geneva Conservatory.

The boy continued to compose by himself with his synthesizer, other instruments and tape recorder. These first devices allowed him to work his music in his studio.

In 1991 he founded a rock band. He also composed and performed as a drummer for Desdemona in the first concert parts of such groups Dionysos (French band) and Astonvilla (French bands).

In the 2000s, he created his own label, Plombage Records, while composing under the name "Tony Snake" pseudonym to honor his herpetologist deceased father, an electronic music project revealed in the albums : Rendez-vous chez le dentiste and Foufounes Alkantara mastered by the Björk and Daft Punk London's engineer "Nilesh Patel", and a remix for Detroit Grand Pubahs, delivering performances in places such "La Java" and Chez Régine in Paris.

In 2010, Vuagniaux came back in his old love, privileging his music with machines such as tape recorders, Minimoog, Mellotron, Crumar, Farfisa, Solina, Clavinet, Fender Rhodes piano, old drum machines, and instruments of all ethnicities or even atonal like Waterphone.

In December 2011, Vuagniaux composed music for video by photographer Régis Golay and La Compagnie 7273, dancers and designers of Swatch watches "Climax", "Nil" et "Romance-S". Then won an award in 2012 at the Munich Film Festival.

In April 2012, he released the album La Virago, in which involved artists such as Alain Carre, Caroline Duris, Marion Devaud, Choral circle of Geneva and Sahoko Sakai.

In 2014, Vuagniaux worked with François Corbier on the track Le Tango du maître chanteur released in Le Clan des guimauves album.

In 2015, for the season 2015-2016, Vuagniaux composed the official soundtrack of "La Comédie de Genève".

In 2018, he was part of the jury of the Science Trophy of the University of Geneva. A title and a certificate of title of recognition are also awarded.

== Discography ==
- Danse avec le tonnerre (album, Melodiastre, 2025, Switzerland)
- Quelques kilomètres pour devenir philosophe (single, Plombage Records, 2020, Switzerland)
- La Paranoïa (single, Plombage Records, 2019, Switzerland)
- L'enfance du Magnétiseur (ep, Plombage Records, 2018, Switzerland)
- Le Magnétiseur (album, Plombage Records, 2018, Switzerland)
- Les Indicatifs De L'institution Genevoise (ep, Genève, 2016, Switzerland)
- Le bal des faux frères (ep, Plombage Records, 2016, Switzerland)
- Jingles 2015-2016 (album, Genève, 2015, Switzerland)
- Le clan des guimauves (album, Plombage Records, 2014, Switzerland)
- Le maître nageur (ep, Plombage Records, 2013, Switzerland)
- Marisa (ep, Plombage Records, 2013, Switzerland)
- La cougar (ep, Plombage Records, 2013, Switzerland)
- L'uruguayenne et les poignards volants (single, Plombage Records, 2013, Switzerland)
- Le sabreur fou (single, Plombage Records, 2013, Switzerland)
- La virago (album, Plombage Records, 2012, Switzerland)
- Mes machines me parlent (ep, Plombage Records, 2011, Switzerland)
- La bobine magique (album, Plombage Records, 2010, Switzerland)
- Souvenirs électroniques (mini album, Plombage Records, 2010, Switzerland)

Under « Tony Snake » project

- Cum Format (ep, Plombage Records, 2010, Switzerland)
- Karateka (ep, Plombage Records, 2010, Switzerland)
- Foufounes Alkantara (ep, Plombage Records, 2009, Switzerland)
- Rendez-vous chez le dentiste (album, Plombage Records, 2008, Switzerland)
- o (single, Plombage Records, 2007, Switzerland)

== Productions and cinematographic directions ==
- Tears (Music video, Angels Dust, Plombage Records, 2017, USA - Switzerland)
- Giallo (Music video, Drumetrics, Plombage Records, 2016, USA - Switzerland)
- The fake brothers' bal (Le Bal Des Faux Frères) (short film, Plombage Records, 2015, Switzerland)
- Born burglars (La Naissance Des Cambrioleurs) (short film, Plombage Records, 2015, Switzerland)
- La mort de Naive (short film, Plombage Records, 2015, Switzerland)
- L'enfant sirène (short film, Plombage Records, 2014, Switzerland)
- Le maître nageur (short film, Plombage Records, 2014, Switzerland)
- Marisa (short film, Plombage Records, 2013, Switzerland )
- Le sabreur fou (short film, Plombage Records, 2013, France)
- Serpent à sonate (short film, Plombage Records, 2012, Switzerland)
- La valse d'Andrée (short film, Plombage Records, 2012, France)
- Longitude altitude solitude (Video illustration, Plombage Records, 2011, Switzerland)
- 69 (short film, Plombage Records, 2010, Italie - Switzerland - USA)
- Maybe i do (Music video, Detroit Grand Pubahs, 2010, Switzerland - USA)

== Awards ==
=== 2019 ===
- Best Music Video at the "Hollywood Horror Fest" for "Naïve's death".
- Best Music Video at the "BscFest from Bucharest" for "Naïve's death".

=== 2018 ===
- Jury Sciences Trophy and Geneva Switzerland University Certificate.

=== 2017 ===
- Best music video at the "Hong Kong Arthouse film festival" for "Tears".
- Winner Honorable mention at the "Los Angeles Film Awards" for "Tears".

=== 2016 ===
- Best music video at the "Los Angeles Cinema Festival of Hollywood" for "The fake brothers' bal (Le Bal Des Faux Frères)".
- Best movie soundtrack at the "Moondance Film Festival" for "Born Burglars (La Naissance Des Cambrioleurs)".
- Best music video at the "Moondance Film Festival" for "Born Burglars (La Naissance Des Cambrioleurs)".
- Best music video at the "New York State International Film Festival" for "The fake brothers' bal (Le Bal Des Faux Frères)".
- Platinum Award best cinematography at the "NYC Indie Film Awards" for "The fake brothers' bal (Le Bal Des Faux Frères)".
- Award of recognition for the cinematography at the "Hollywood International Moving Picture Film Festival" for "The fake brothers' bal".
- Award of recognition for the music video at the "Hollywood International Moving Picture Film Festival" for "The fake brothers' bal".
- Silver Award at the "International Independent Film Festival" of Encino for "The fake brothers' bal (Le Bal Des Faux Frères)".

== Recognition ==
Commander of French Cordons Bleus

== Television ==
- RTS (Swiss Television Radio) Show "Plein le poste" January 2014.
- Leman Bleu (Swiss Television) Show "Replay" June 2016.
