= Zac Baird =

American keyboardist

Zach Baird
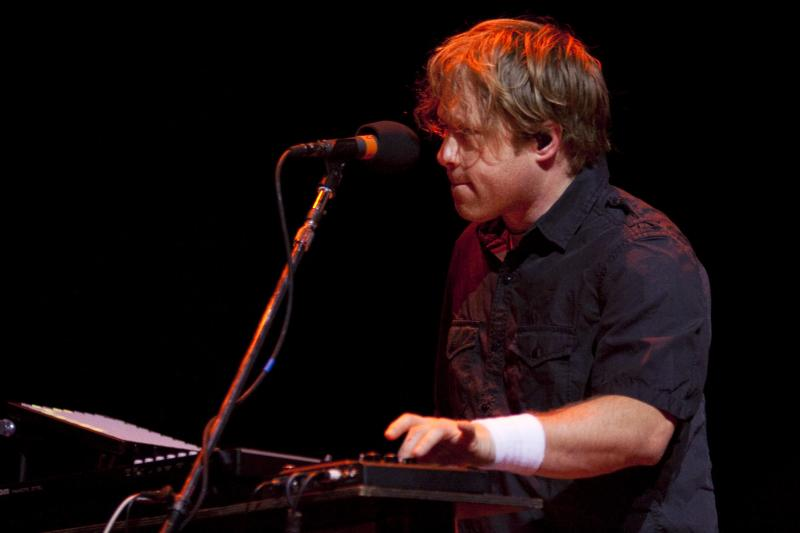
- Zach Baird (2010)

Background information
- Born: Zachary Baird; February 16, 1971 (age 55); Orange County, California, U.S.
- Genres: Alternative rock; alternative metal; hip hop; punk rock; electronica; funk; pop
- Occupation: Musician
- Instruments: Keyboards; synthesizer; programming
- Years active: 1989–present
- Formerly of: Fear and the Nervous System; BillyGoat; Hairy Apes BMX; Whitey

Zachary Baird (born February 16, 1971) is an American keyboardist known for collaborating with the nu metal band Korn. He is also noted for using the Moog synthesizer, as well as the Ondes Martenot.

== Early life ==
Zach Baird graduated from the Arts Magnet, Booker T. Washington High School for the Performing and Visual Arts in Dallas, Texas.

== Career ==
Baird's first project was a 15-piece funk band called Whitey, but he then joined the band Billy Goat in 1990 and was a member for six years. Over the years he either founded or was involved in numerous other projects and bands, including:

- Cottonmouth Texas
- Decadent Dub Team
- Hairy Apes BMX
- Maimou

Baird has collaborated with artists from various music genres, including Edie Brickell, Everlast, Evanescence (provided programming for their debut album "Fallen"), Colin Hay, Daniel Powter, Mike Dillon, and Stone Gossard.

He auditioned for Nine Inch Nails:

I never even met Trent Reznor. I just played along with a prerecorded tape. They had this work area set up where there were no other musicians to play along with, and the guys in the band all sat up in this dark balcony area where I couldn't even see them. Or, at least I think they were up there. It was just weird.

Baird was also auditioned for alternative artist Beck; he describes it as great experience:

Trying out for Beck's band was great. He was just set up in this cool little room, and we jammed on five or six of his songs.

Baird toured with pop singer and pianist Daniel Powter through Europe in 2005. In late 2009 and early 2010, Baird was part of Adam Lambert's band, providing programming, working as his music director, and playing keyboards.

Baird toured as a keyboard tech for Beyonce's Renaissance World Tour, which started in Europe on May 10th 2023 and ended in America on October 1st 2023.

=== Work with Korn ===
Baird has worked with nu metal band Korn, touring with them worldwide as a masked horse (which in turn, Baird got his nickname "Horse") in the See You on the Other Side tour, as well as in their 2006 edition of the Family Values Tour. He has temporarily joined the band for their eighth studio album. Collaboration with Korn and his previous projects was quite a difference for him:

This has really been a trip. I've been working here all day long every day at the band's rehearsal space at S.I.R. Studios in Hollywood, just learning every song and getting used to all of this amazing gear.

On December 9, 2006, Baird performed with Korn on MTV Unplugged: Korn, playing piano. After the Bitch We Got a Problem Tour, Baird continued to work with Korn frontman Jonathan Davis on his Alone I Play tour, as a part of his backing band SFA. In 2011, Baird played the keyboard on Korn guitarist Munky's solo project, Fear and the Nervous System. He also toured with Korn during 2013's The Paradigm Shift tour, and the 20th Anniversary Tour from 2014 through 2015. Spotify credits Zac as a composer on Korn's 2023 "Untitled" album.

== Discography ==
- 1992 – "Bush Roaming Mammals" – Billy Goat
- 1994 – "Live at the Swingers Ball" – Billy Goat
- 1995 – "Black & White" – Billy Goat
- 1997 – "Anti-Social Butterfly" – Cottonmouth, Texas
- 1999 – "The Right to Remain Silent" – Cottonmouth, Texas
- 2000 – "Expatriape" – HairyApesBMX
- 2001 – "Out Demons" – HairyApesBMX
- 2001 – "Bayleaf" – Stone Gossard
- 2002 – "Ultimate Collection" – Edie Brickell and the New Bohemians
- 2002 – "Slow Drip Torture" – Maimou
- 2003 – "Fallen" – Evanescence
- 2004 – "Persephonics" – Maimou
- 2005 – "Just Like Heaven" – Soundtrack
- 2006 – "Chopped, Screwed, Live and Unglued" – Korn
- 2007 – "MTV Unplugged: Korn" – Korn
- 2007 – "Untitled" – Korn
- 2007 – "Alone I Play" – Jonathan Davis and the SFA
- 2009 – "Digital EP #1" – Korn
- 2008 – "Nightmare Revisited" – various artists
- 2010 – "Digital EP #2" – Korn
- 2010 – "Digital EP #3" – Korn
- 2011 – "Alone I Play / Live at the Union Chapel" – Jonathan Davis and the SFA
- 2011 – "Fear and the Nervous System" – Fear and the Nervous System
- 2012 – "The Path of Totality Tour – Live at the Hollywood Palladium" – Korn
- 2012 – "The Truth About Love" – Pink
- 2012 – "Urn" – Mike Dillon
- 2013 – "Afraid of Heights" – Wavves

== TV appearances ==
- The Jay Leno Show
- The Tonight Show with Jay Leno
- The Tonight Show with Conan O'Brien
- David Letterman
- The Oprah Winfrey Show
- MTV Unplugged
- VH1's "Unplugged"
- Ellen DeGeneres
- American Music Awards
- Good Morning America
- The Today Show
- Lopez Tonight
- Jimmy Kimmel Live!

== Keyboard instruments ==
- Moog Synthesizers
- Access Virus
- Novation
- Analogue Systems
- Critter & Guitari
- Roland JX-305
- Roland JX-3P
- Roland JX-8P
- Roland JV-1080
- Roland TR-606
- Roland TR-707
- Roland TR-909
- Roland XP-80
- Clavia Nord Lead
- Clavia Nord Electro 2
- Clavia Nord Modular
- Korg M1
- Korg MS2000
- Kurzweil K2000
- Analog synthesizers
- Yamaha Piano
- Hammond Organ
- Ondes Martenot

== See also ==
- List of Moog synthesizer players
