= Fear and the Nervous System =

American rock band

- Origin: New York City, U.S.
- Genre: Alternative metal
- Years active: 2008–2014
- Label: Emotional Syphon
- Past members: James "Munky" Shaffer; Steve Krolikowski; Zac Baird; Tim Kelleher; Elias Mallin; Billy Gould; Leopold Ross; Brooks Wackerman
- Website: fatns.com

Fear and the Nervous System was an alternative metal band formed by Korn guitarist James "Munky" Shaffer. The band released one self-titled album in 2012 and disbanded in 2014.

== History ==
In early 2008, Korn guitarist James "Munky" Shaffer announced plans to release a new project entitled Fear and the Nervous System (probably a reference to Michael Powell's 1960 film "Peeping Tom"). The record was said to be released in late 2008, through his own label, Emotional Syphon Recordings. The songs are being recorded at Music Grinder Studios in Hollywood, California.

In July 2008, Wes Borland described the recording sessions:

"It sort of, that's still up in the air as far as what's going to happen with that. Munky from Korn put that project together and the way it went down is he invited a bunch of musicians to the Korn studios and had sort of just a jam going for like a week to where every day different combinations of people would come in and play. Sometimes he would play and sometimes he wouldn't and then he and an engineer pieced together songs from all of these jams." "He had us come back in and I ended up having two things on the album that I played on. I came in and listened to what they put together and then out of the pieces that I had been involved with writing, sort of, because it was improvisation, then I wrote parts back on top of the improvisations. So it's sort of a weird concept as far as... It's definitely a strange way to make an album, but so I'm involved to that extent just by being on two songs and I did the artwork for the album."

— Wes Borland, Artisan News Service

Shaffer also described the recording sessions as really unorthodox and more like a jam session than a regular recording session. The band also used different tunings to make the music stand apart from Shaffer's previous work with Korn.

On July 15, Shaffer announced on the project's MySpace profile that the album will not be ready for the previously mentioned August 8, 2008-release because he did not want to rush production. He also stated that Wes Borland's appearance on the record did not make the final cut, however the cover art designed by Wes will still be used.

On August 21, 2008, Jonathan Davis mentioned on his live stream that he has heard one song from Munky's solo project, and that all Munky has to do is the vocals, which Jonathan was personally excited about. Munky has reported that the record is three quarters done with all of the music done and recorded for the record and he has been working on the lyrics.

In October 2009, Shaffer explained that he would not be doing vocals on the new Fear and the Nervous System album because he's not "very good at singing". It was later announced that Steve Krolikowski of Repeater would be handling vocal duties. On June 29, 2011, the song "Choking Victim" was released for free download from the official Fear and the Nervous System website.

After much delay, the music video for the track "Choking Victim" was released in August 2012. The band's first music video was soon followed by the band's full-length album which was finally released on two listening formats. The album is currently available as physical copies which are sold in select retail stores, as well as through many online retail outlets for easy online purchase. The Fear and the Nervous System's debut album has also been made available through digital download formats in mid-September 2012. Both the video for "Choking Victim", and the full-length album were met with major critical acclaim worldwide with positive reviews by critics, everyday music fans, Korn fans, and non-Korn fans alike.

In an interview conducted in September 2012, Limp Bizkit frontman Fred Durst, on the topic of his favorite new bands of 2012, had expressed great enthusiasm and kind words for his friend James Shaffer, and stated that Fear and the Nervous System was a "Pretty 'dope' band" that he really enjoys, and is crossing his fingers that a tour with his nu-metal entourage Limp Bizkit, Korn, Deftones, Fear and the Nervous System, Black Light Burns, Hollywood Undead and others, that would hopefully come to fruition. Durst continued, saying it would be the tour of the century.

== Band members ==
Final lineup

- Steve Krolikowski – lead vocals (2009–2014), rhythm guitar (2012–2014)
- James Christian Shaffer – lead guitar (2008–2014)
- Zac Baird – keyboards (2008–2014)
- Tim Kelleher – bass (2012–2014)
- Elias Mallin – drums, percussion (2012–2014)

Former members

- Leopold Ross – rhythm guitar (2008–2012)
- Billy Gould – bass (2008–2012)
- Brooks Wackerman – drums, percussion (2008–2012)

== Discography ==
Studio albums

List of studio albums
Title	Album details
Fear and the Nervous System	Released: September 18, 2012 (US); Label: Emotional Syphon; Formats: CD, digital download
