= James Shaffer =

American guitarist

James "Munky" Shaffer
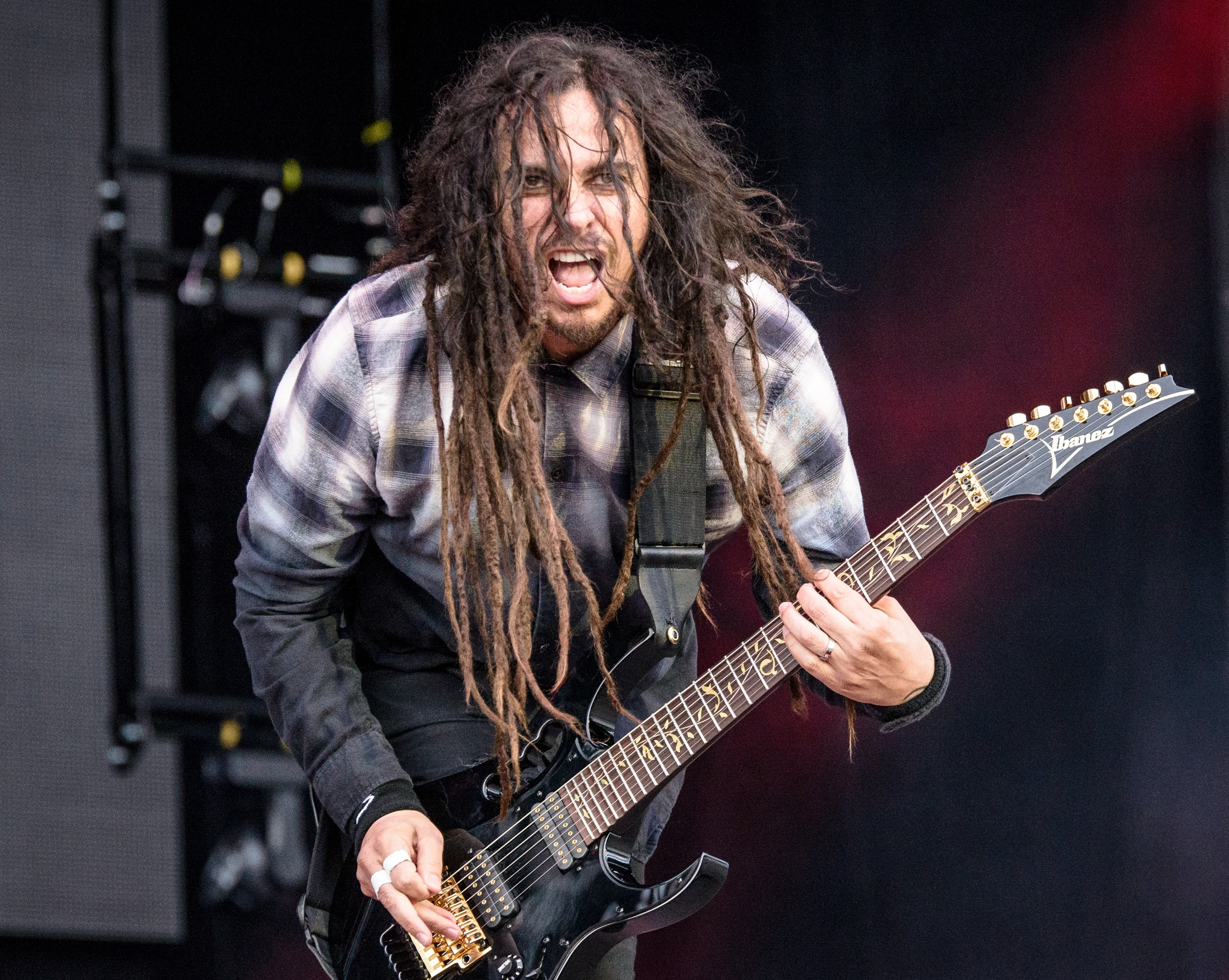
- Munky with Korn at Rock im Park 2016

Background information
- Also known as: Munky; Munk; the Gorilla
- Born: James Christian Shaffer; June 6, 1970 (age 56); Rosedale, California, U.S.
- Genres: Nu metal; alternative metal; funk metal
- Occupation: Musician
- Instrument: Guitar
- Years active: 1989–present
- Member of: Korn; Venera
- Formerly of: L.A.P.D.; Fear and the Nervous System

James Christian Shaffer (born June 6, 1970), also known by his stage name "Munky", is an American musician best known as a co-founder and guitarist of the nu metal band Korn. He was ranked at No. 26 of Guitar World's 100 Greatest Heavy Metal Guitarists of All Time.

Shaffer set up the side-project band Fear and the Nervous System in 2008 and is also the founder of Emotional Syphon Recordings, which has signed acts like Monster in the Machine and Droid.

== Early life ==
Shaffer was born June 6, 1970, in Rosedale, California. He was adopted by his parents as an infant, along with two other siblings. Shaffer and the other members of Korn grew up in the agricultural town of Bakersfield, California, two hours north of Los Angeles.

His nickname "Munky" originated from how his toes looked when spread apart, resembling a monkey's fingers.

As a teenager, Shaffer severed the tip of his finger in an accident with a three-wheeled ATV. His doctor recommended playing an instrument as physical therapy, which led him to pick up the guitar.

== Career ==
=== Early musical career ===
Shaffer, along with future Korn members David Silveria and Reginald Arvizu, formed the band L.A.P.D. with singer Richard Morrill in the late 1980s. When the band moved from Bakersfield to Los Angeles, Silveria dropped out of high school and Shaffer stayed in Bakersfield. When Shaffer reunited with the band, they found a manager and released an EP entitled Love and Peace Dude in 1989 through Triple X Records. L.A.P.D. released their first full-length studio album on May 3, 1991, entitled Who's Laughing Now. After releasing two albums, L.A.P.D. broke up. They were also briefly known as Creep, recording a demo with a singer named Corey until Shaffer, Arvizu, and Silveria enlisted Brian Welch and Jonathan Davis to form the band that went on to become Korn.

=== Korn (1993–present) ===
When thinking of a band name, someone suggested "corn", but the band rejected that name. Shaffer then had the idea to spell the name with a "K" instead of a "C", and a backwards "R", so the band's name would appear as "KoЯn". According to both Shaffer and Jonathan Davis, the idea came from the logo of toy retailer Toys R Us, which several members had worked at during their youth. The stylized name was chosen to create a distorted, childlike aesthetic.

On February 22, 2005, Brian "Head" Welch left the band citing a spiritual awakening. Shaffer accepted his friend's choice and the two remained on good terms. Welch rejoined Korn on May 2, 2013, and contributed to the album The Paradigm Shift released in October 2013.

Drummer David Silveria left the band in 2006, initially stating it would be a temporary break to focus on family and business. Shaffer later revealed that Silveria had fully distanced himself from music at the time.

=== Fear and the Nervous System (2008–present) ===
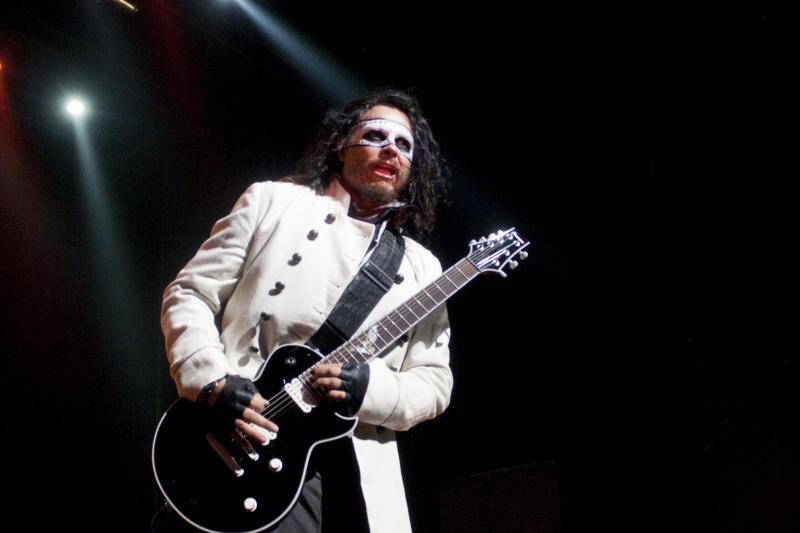
Shaffer on stage in São Paulo, Brazil in April 2010

On March 4, 2008, it was announced that Shaffer would be releasing a solo record with his side project Fear and The Nervous System. The band included Shaffer on guitars, Brooks Wackerman (of Bad Religion) on drums, Leopold Ross on guitars and programming, Bill Gould (of Faith No More) on bass, and Zac Baird (Korn's keyboardist) on keyboards and programming. Guitarist Wes Borland contributed early recordings and the album artwork.

The album, originally slated for 2008, was delayed due to scheduling conflicts and was eventually released digitally in October 2011.

Shaffer later stepped back from vocal duties, stating he did not feel confident singing. Steve Krolikowski of Repeater was announced as the lead vocalist.

=== Emotional Syphon Recordings (2006–present) ===
In 2006, Shaffer founded Emotional Syphon Recordings, an independent label created to support diverse and daring new artists. The first bands signed were Droid and Monster in the Machine. Shaffer stated that his goal was to give artists complete creative freedom and release music across multiple genres.

=== Venera (2023–present) ===
In 2023, Shaffer announced the formation of Venera, a glitch and dark electronic music project with composer Chris Hunt. Their self-titled debut album was released on Ipecac Recordings on October 13, 2023.

== Personal life ==
On January 15, 2000, Shaffer married Stephanie Roush. Together, they had a daughter named Carmella Star Shaffer, born in 2001. In 2004, Shaffer and Roush divorced.

Shaffer began dating actress and model Evis Xheneti in 2005. They were married on January 2, 2012, in Paris, France. They have three children together, born in 2012, 2015, and 2019. Their first son, D'Angelo Draxon Shaffer, was born in November 2012.

== Equipment ==
Shaffer predominantly uses Ibanez guitars, most often his signature Apex or K7 7-string models.

== Discography ==
With L.A.P.D.

- 1989 – Love and Peace, Dude
- 1991 – Who's Laughing Now
- 1997 – L.A.P.D (Compilation)

With Korn

- 1994 – Korn
- 1996 – Life Is Peachy
- 1998 – Follow the Leader
- 1999 – Issues
- 2002 – Untouchables
- 2003 – Take a Look in the Mirror
- 2005 – See You on the Other Side
- 2007 – Untitled album
- 2010 – Korn III: Remember Who You Are
- 2011 – The Path of Totality
- 2013 – The Paradigm Shift
- 2016 – The Serenity of Suffering
- 2019 – The Nothing
- 2022 – Requiem

With Fear and the Nervous System

- 2012 – Fear and the Nervous System

With $UICIDEBOY$ x Travis Barker

- 2019 – Live Fast, Die Whenever

With Venera

- 2023 – Venera
- 2025 – Exinfinite
