= Repeater (band) =

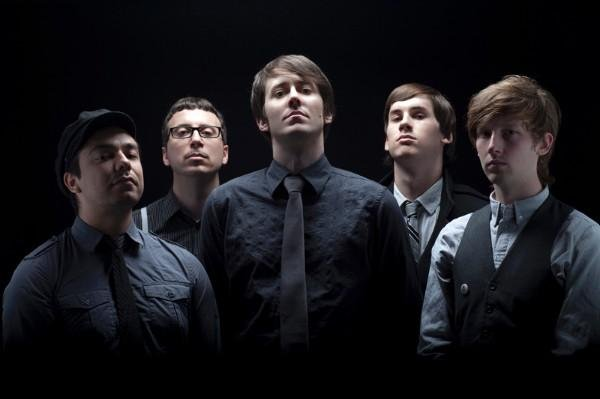

Background information
- Origin: Long Beach, California, U.S.
- Genres: Art rock, indie rock, post-punk
- Years active: 2006–present
- Labels: I AM Recordings; White Label Collective; A Diamond Heart Production
- Members: Steve Krolikowski; Alex Forsythe; Tess Shapiro; Christopher Fudurich; Charlie Woodburn
- Past members: Rob Wallace; Matt Hanief; Victor Cuevas
- Website: www.repeaterband.com

Repeater is a five-piece rock band from Long Beach, California.

== Biography ==
=== The Main Frame days (2001–2004) ===
The Main Frame was a Long Beach darkwave band formed in 2001 with Steve Krolikowski (vocals and guitar) and Rob Wallace (keyboard). After recording a full-length album, Curse of Evolution (2003) and an unreleased EP, the band decided to dissolve.

=== Formation of Repeater (2005) ===
Krolikowski and Wallace continued to work on music together, eventually forming Repeater and eventually added new members into the fold, including Alex Forsythe (guitar) and Matt Hanief (drums).

Repeater released their first demo in 2005, followed by Motionless Hour EP in 2007 and their full-length album, Iron Flowers in 2008. Both Motionless Hour and Iron Flowers were released through the band's own Document Records.

=== Work with Ross Robinson (2010) ===
In 2010, the band was discovered by producer, Ross Robinson. Robinson produced the band's next EP called Patterns, as well as their second full-length album, We Walk From Safety. The band released Patterns EP as a joint-release through I AM Recordings and their newly created White Label Collective.

=== Fear and the Nervous System ===
They released a free download of the song "Choking Victim" on June 29, 2011.

=== We Walk From Safety (2011) ===
Almost two years after the actual recording, Repeater's full-length album, We Walk From Safety was released on August 2, 2011.

=== Golden Ships EP (2013) ===
Repeater's final recording with Hanief and Wallace, the Golden Ships EP was recorded in 2011 and mixed in 2013 by Josh One.

=== Repeater (self titled) (2014) ===
Continuing song ideas which began before the band's breakup, Krolikowski went ahead with plans to produce another album with Fudurich. Using an eponymous title, this record is a studio project with collaborators Krolikowski, Forsythe, Fudurich, Tess Shapiro on vocals, and Charlie Woodburn on drums.

== Discography ==
Studio albums

- Iron Flowers (2008)
- We Walk from Safety (2011)

EPs and demos

- Repeater [demo] (2005)
- Motionless Hour (2007)
- Patterns (2010)
- Golden Ships (2013)

== See also ==
- Repeater (disambiguation)
