= The Book of Eli (soundtrack) =

The Book of Eli (Original Motion Picture Soundtrack)

Film score by Atticus Ross, Leopold Ross and Claudia Sarne
- Released: January 12, 2010
- Recorded: 2009
- Studios: Abbey Road Studios, London; Glenwood Place Studios, Burbank, California
- Genre: Film score
- Length: 47:01
- Label: Reprise
- Producer: Atticus Ross

Atticus Ross chronology
New York, I Love You (2008)	The Book of Eli (2010)	The Social Network (2010)

Leopold Ross and Claudia Sarne chronology
New York, I Love You (2008)	The Book of Eli (2010)	Broken City (2013)

The Book of Eli (Original Motion Picture Soundtrack) is the film score to the 2010 film The Book of Eli directed by the Hughes brothers, starring Denzel Washington, Gary Oldman, Mila Kunis, Ray Stevenson, and Jennifer Beals. The film score is composed by Atticus Ross, Leopold Ross and Claudia Sarne and released through Reprise Records on January 12, 2010.

== Background ==
The Book of Eli marked the feature film score composition debut of Atticus Ross, even before his popularity before his Academy Award-winning score for The Social Network (2010). Atticus previously worked with Hughes brothers' on the American TV series Touching Evil (2004) and a segment of New York, I Love You (2008), directed by Allan, and also worked with wife Claudia Sarne and brother Leopold Ross, for the film score. The compositions were written at their home studio in Burbank, before recording it at the Abbey Road Studios with an 80-piece orchestra.

== Reception ==
Thom Jurek of AllMusic wrote "The cues, whether they be adorned by strings, synths, guitars, drums, or operatic voices, are equally balanced and utilized not simply as workmanlike devices for furthering the story in the film, but to adorn a work that can be widely enjoyed apart from its cinematic counterpart." Todd McCarthy of Variety wrote "The strange and varied electronic score by Atticus Ross, Claudia Sarne and Leopold Ross is a welcome departure from the musical norm." Manohla Dargis of The New York Times found the score to be "thrilling".

Kirk Honeycutt of The Hollywood Reporter called it "an energetic, pulsating score from Atticus Ross (assisted by Claudia Sarne and Leopold Ross)." Chris of We Are Movie Geeks wrote "There's much to be said for simplicity, but Ross is nothing if not a deft conjurer of appealing and appalling sound so here he brings that to the table in spades." Ray Pride of Newcity wrote "The best that can be said about the outsized score is that Atticus Ross composes in the key of self-parody."

== Track listing ==
No.	Title	Length
1.	"Panoramic"	7:13
2.	"Outland"	3:08
3.	"The Journey"	4:27
4.	"Amen"	1:51
5.	"The Convoy"	1:51
6.	"Solara Violated"	1:04
7.	"Safe"	1:22
8.	"Human"	2:07
9.	"Meant to be Shared"	2:46
10.	"The Passenger"	1:56
11.	"Den of Vice"	2:15
12.	"Gattling"	1:23
13.	"Blind Faith"	2:01
14.	"Convoy Destruct"	4:55
15.	"Movement"	3:05
16.	"Carnegie's Demise"	3:37
17.	"The Purpose"	2:00
Total length:		47:01

== Personnel ==
Credits adapted from liner notes:

- Music composers – Atticus Ross, Claudia Sarne, Leopold Ross
- Music producer and arranger – Atticus Ross
- Orchestra leader – Perry Montague-Mason
- Orchestrator – Dana Niu
- Conductor – Nick Ingman
- Contractor – Isobel Griffiths
- Recording – Atticus Ross, Leopold Ross, Joe Barresi
- Mixing – Doug Trantow
- Mastering – Tom Baker
- Music supervisor – Deva Anderson
- Executive producer – Albert Hughes

Principal performers

- Cello – Anthony Pleeth
- Double bass – Chris Laurence
- French horn – Michael Thompson
- Live drums – Brooks Wackerman
- Trombone – Mark Nightingale
- Trumpet – Derek Watkins
- Viola – Bruce White
- Violin – Emlyn Singleton

== Accolades ==
Award	Date of ceremony	Category	Recipient(s)	Result	Ref.
Black Reel Awards	February 10, 2011	Outstanding Original Score	Atticus Ross, Leopold Ross and Claudia Sarne	Nominated	
World Soundtrack Awards	October 23, 2010	Discovery of the Year	Atticus Ross	Nominated	
