= Triple 9 (soundtrack) =

Triple 9 (Original Motion Picture Soundtrack)

Film score by Atticus Ross, Leopold Ross, Claudia Sarne and Bobby Krlic
- Released: February 26, 2016
- Genre: Film score
- Length: 50:41
- Labels: Filmtrax; RED Music
- Producers: Atticus Ross; Leopold Ross; Claudia Sarne; Bobby Krlic

Atticus Ross chronology
Almost Holy (2015)	Triple 9 (2016)	Visions of Harmony (2016)

Leopold Ross chronology
Almost Holy (2015)	Triple 9 (2016)	Outcast (2016)

Claudia Sarne chronology
Broken City (2013)	Triple 9 (2016)	Outcast (2016)

Bobby Krlic chronology
Almost Holy (2015)	Triple 9 (2016)	Shooter (2016)

Singles from Triple 9 (Original Motion Picture Soundtrack)
- 1. "After I Die" Released: February 12, 2016; 2. "Wreckless" Released: February 19, 2016

Triple 9 (Original Motion Picture Soundtrack) is the film score composed by Atticus Ross, Leopold Ross, Claudia Sarne and Bobby Krlic to the 2016 film Triple 9 directed by John Hillcoat featuring an ensemble cast starring Casey Affleck, Chiwetel Ejiofor, Anthony Mackie, Aaron Paul, Clifton Collins Jr., Norman Reedus, Teresa Palmer, Michael K. Williams, Gal Gadot, Woody Harrelson, and Kate Winslet. The album was preceded by two singles: "After I Die" and "Wreckless" while the soundtrack was released through Filmtrax and RED Music on February 26, 2016.

== Development ==
In February 2012, it was reported that Nick Cave who collaborated with Hillcoat as a screenwriter and co-composer on most of his films, was announced as the film's composer. However, Cave left the project due to undisclosed reasons, and electronic musician Atticus Ross of Nine Inch Nails was announced as the film's composer. Atticus composed the score with his wife Claudia Sarne, brother Leopold Ross and electronic musician Bobby Krlic. Hillcoat considered an electronic and unsophisticated score where "not everything [would be] fixed and made perfect in Pro Tools" while also being devoid of piano and strings.

Atticus noted that Hillcoat was very much involved in the musical composition, having a particular vision that the music was "very raw sounding electronics" with a bizarre saxophone sound to be included for some reasons unknown. Atticus, however, found it difficult as he wanted to get the story right and then the music, but the scenes would change around at times, becoming redundant. He also admitted on how Hillcoat bringing a sense of intellectuality and visual style in his films, making it more unique.

Atticus considered that it took him a long time to get the story, due to the change in scenes and reshoots happening. Much of the film's music was altered in the mixing and editing, due to the constant motion of the film. The last scene of Harrelson's car was flown in on the last day of the final mix, which was shot by Hillcoat on Skype, which was more a shifting palate in terms of story. Musically, Hillcoat ended up changing several pieces to suit the changing motion of the picture, which in turn provided a "more frustrating" experience.

The film's red band trailer featured Atticus' remix of Cypress Hill's "Pigs" which was also included in the soundtrack. Late DJ Screw's compositions "Wreckless" and "After I Die" (featuring K-Rhino) were chopped and screwed for the film, although not being included in the soundtrack.

== Reception ==
Justin Chang of Variety called it a "propulsive wall-of-sound score". Todd McCarthy of The Hollywood Reporter, however, found it "ineffective". Ian Freer of Empire noted that Atticus' "synth and sax score" had an "interesting texture". Mark Jenkins of NPR called it an "electro-throb score". Sandy Schaefer of Screen Rant wrote "the film's pulsating score is more inventive and infuses the proceedings with a crackling energy that they might not have possessed otherwise."

Laura DeMarco of The Plain Dealer wrote "Atticus Ross' driving industrial beats and feedback only add to the tension." Jamie Graham of GamesRadar+ wrote "Even Hillcoat's favoured composer, Nick Cave, gave way to experimental noise-mongers Atticus Ross and Bobby Krlic, the former responsible for the demented score of The Girl With The Dragon Tattoo (with Nine Inch Nails' Trent Reznor), the latter known for his ambient drone metal."

== Track listing ==
No.	Title	Artist(s)	Length
1.	"Ticking Glock"	Atticus Ross; Leopold Ross; Claudia Sarne	6:28
2.	"The Drop"	A. Ross; L. Ross; Sarne	2:06
3.	"Eleven Fifty Nine"	A. Ross; L. Ross; Sarne	6:21
4.	"The Butcher's Shop"	A. Ross; Bobby Krlic	4:45
5.	"What Happens Now?"	A. Ross; L. Ross; Sarne	2:05
6.	"War Porn"	A. Ross; L. Ross; Sarne	2:35
7.	"Conversating"	A. Ross; L. Ross; Sarne	1:18
8.	"Jeffrey's Nightcrawl"	Krlic	4:10
9.	"Some Hope"	A. Ross; L. Ross; Sarne	1:50
10.	"Heist # 2"	A. Ross; L. Ross; Sarne	3:49
11.	"Michael's Death"	A. Ross; L. Ross; Sarne	2:20
12.	"Probably a Robbery"	A. Ross; L. Ross; Sarne	2:27
13.	"Mysteron"	A. Ross; L. Ross; Sarne	3:43
14.	"Pigs" (Atticus Ross Remix)	Cypress Hill	6:44
