= Error (band) =

American digital hardcore band

- Origin: Los Angeles, California, United States
- Genre: Digital hardcore
- Years active: 2003–2006
- Label: Epitaph
- Past members: Atticus Ross; Brett Gurewitz; Leopold Ross

Error was an American digital hardcore band founded in 2003 by 12 Rounds member and Nine Inch Nails collaborator Atticus Ross, and Bad Religion guitarist Brett Gurewitz. Since the 2004 release of their self-titled EP, the project has been on an indefinite hold.

== History ==
According to a Metal Hammer article on the band; "Error came about when Atticus realised his cocking about in the studio had produced something along the lines of actual songs." Atticus recruited his younger brother Leopold Ross to play drums and Bad Religion member and Epitaph Records owner Brett Gurewitz to play guitar and bass.

Dillinger Escape Plan frontman Greg Puciato was also recruited to perform vocals on the band's first release, but he is only considered to be a temporary member. The band released its first record, a self-titled EP, in 2004. The EP features The Locust's keyboardist Joey Karam playing a Moog synthesizer on the track "Jack The Ripper". Prior to the EP's release, Error released a remix of the Transplants' song on Punk-O-Rama 8 in 2003 entitled "Quick Death (Error Remix)".

Error was reported to be looking for a full-time vocalist for touring and for an upcoming album, however the future of the band has been a topic for discussion on many internet message boards. No further news has been released on the status of the new album, however as the first EP was created with virtually no outside knowledge, the album may be similarly produced behind closed doors.

Around 2005, Error recorded a new song, titled "Wild World", that appears on a tribute album to The Birthday Party called Release the Bats: The Birthday Party as Heard Through the Meat Grinder of Three One G, which was released on April 4, 2006. The song is available on iTunes. Leo Ross is the vocalist on this release, the track was also mixed by Atticus's long-time engineer Doug Trantow.

As of 2009, it is unlikely that Error will return anytime in the future. Gurewitz has continued touring and making records with Bad Religion and the Ross brothers have been busy with their own projects. In a 2011 interview with Greg Puciato, he discussed the possibility of doing a second EP with Error, however, Puciato later contradicted this statement, confirming in 2012 that Error is "dead as of now".

== Discography ==
- Error (2004)
