= Earthquake Bird =

- Official poster
- Directed by: Wash Westmoreland
- Screenplay by: Wash Westmoreland
- Based on: The Earthquake Bird by Susanna Jones
- Produced by: Georgina Pope; Michael Pruss; Ann Ruark; Ridley Scott; Kevin J. Walsh
- Starring: Alicia Vikander; Riley Keough; Naoki Kobayashi; Jack Huston
- Cinematography: Chung Chung-hoon
- Edited by: Jonathan Alberts
- Music by: Atticus Ross; Leopold Ross; Claudia Sarne
- Production companies: Scott Free Productions; Twenty First City
- Distributed by: Netflix
- Release dates: October 10, 2019 (LFF); November 1, 2019 (United States)
- Running time: 107 minutes
- Countries: United Kingdom; United States
- Languages: English; Japanese

Earthquake Bird is a 2019 psychological thriller film written and directed by Wash Westmoreland based on the 2001 novel of the same name by Susanna Jones. It stars Alicia Vikander, Riley Keough, Naoki Kobayashi and Jack Huston.

It had its world premiere at the BFI London Film Festival on October 10, 2019. It was released on November 1, 2019, before digital streaming on November 15, 2019, by Netflix.

== Plot summary ==
"a love triangle involving two English girls and a Japanese guy"

In 1989 Tokyo, Japan, Lucy Fly is a young Swedish immigrant who is working as a translator at a manufacturing company, and is suspected of murder when her American friend Lily Bridges goes missing.

The plot is sometimes shown in flashbacks, including some of Lucy's childhood, as well as scenes of her romantic relationship with Teiji and friendship with Lily. Teiji's hobby includes taking photographs of nature scenes such as water reflections and abandoned buildings. When Teiji first meets Lucy, he says he rarely takes photos of people, yet wants to take her portrait. Teiji has a peculiar habit of locking his favorite photos away in a filing cabinet rather than displaying them to the public.

During a vacation to Sado Island, Lucy's friendship with Lily sours when she discovers that Teiji has begun a romantic relationship with Lily behind her back. Following the disappearance of Lily, Lucy is arrested and interrogated by Japanese detectives. Lucy claims that she murdered Lily in a fit of jealous rage, but is cleared after the body is identified as belonging to someone else. After being released, Lucy discovers evidence in Teiji's photo collection implicating him in Lily's murder and disappearance. Teiji attacks Lucy but she kills him in self-defense.

The film ends with Lucy in a cemetery with her Japanese friend Ms. Kato, reflecting on the past.

== Cast ==
- Alicia Vikander as Lucy Fly
- Riley Keough as Lily Bridges
- Naoki Kobayashi as Teiji Matsuda
- Jack Huston as Bob
- Kiki Sukezane as Natsuko
- Ken Yamamura as Oguchi
- Yoshiko Sakuma as Yamamoto
- Akiko Iwase as Ms. Kato

== Production ==
In August 2016, it was announced Wash Westmoreland would write and direct the film, based upon the novel of the same name by Susanna Jones. Michael Schaefer, Michael Pruss, Ann Ruark, Georgina Pope will produce the film, while Ridley Scott will serve as an executive producer on the film, under their Scott Free Productions and Twenty First City banners, respectively, with Amazon Studios originally set to distribute. In March 2018, Alicia Vikander and Riley Keough joined the cast of the film, with Netflix distributing. In April 2018, Jack Huston joined the cast of the film. In May 2018, Naoki Kobayashi joined the cast of the film, with production beginning that same month, in Tokyo. Sado Island was also used as a filming location.

== Release ==
It had its world premiere at the BFI London Film Festival on October 10, 2019. It was released on November 1, 2019, in a limited release before digital streaming on November 15, 2019.

== Reception ==
On the review aggregator website Rotten Tomatoes, the film holds an approval rating of 50% based on 40 reviews, with an average of 5.5/10. The website's critical consensus reads, "Riley Keough and Alicia Vikander give it their all, but Earthquake Bird suffers from a frustrating inability to bring its literary source material consistently to life." On Metacritic, the film holds a rating of 48 out of 100, based on 10 critics, indicating "mixed or average" reviews.

"Worst of all, “Earthquake Bird” is just dull." Brian Tallerico, RogerEbert.com
