= Error (Error EP) =

EP by Error
- Released: February 24, 2004
- Genre: Hardcore punk; digital hardcore; industrial rock
- Length: 17:12
- Label: Epitaph
- Producer: Error

Professional ratings
Review scores
Source	Rating
AllMusic	4/5 stars
Punknews.org	4/5 stars
Rolling Stone	2/5 stars

Error is the self-titled debut EP by American digital hardcore band Error, released by Epitaph Records in 2004. It is their only recorded work to date.

Although not an official member, Greg Puciato of the Dillinger Escape Plan was asked to record vocals for the EP, as the band was without a vocalist at the time.

== Track listing ==
All tracks are written by Atticus Ross, Leopold Ross, and Brett Gurewitz, except where noted.

No.	Title	Writer(s)	Length
1.	"Nothing's Working"		2:38
2.	"Homicide" (999 cover)	Guy Martin Days, Keith Roger Lucas	3:46
3.	"Burn in Hell"		3:10
4.	"Jack the Ripper"		3:34
5.	"Brains Out"		4:02

== Personnel ==
- Greg Puciato - lead vocals
- Atticus Ross - programming
- Brett Gurewitz - guitar, bass
- Leopold Ross - drums, percussion
- Joey Karam - Moog synthesizer on "Jack the Ripper"

== Credits ==
- Published by Sick Muse Songs
- Administered by EMI Music Publishing
- Design by Nick Pritchard
