= Wash Westmoreland =

British film director

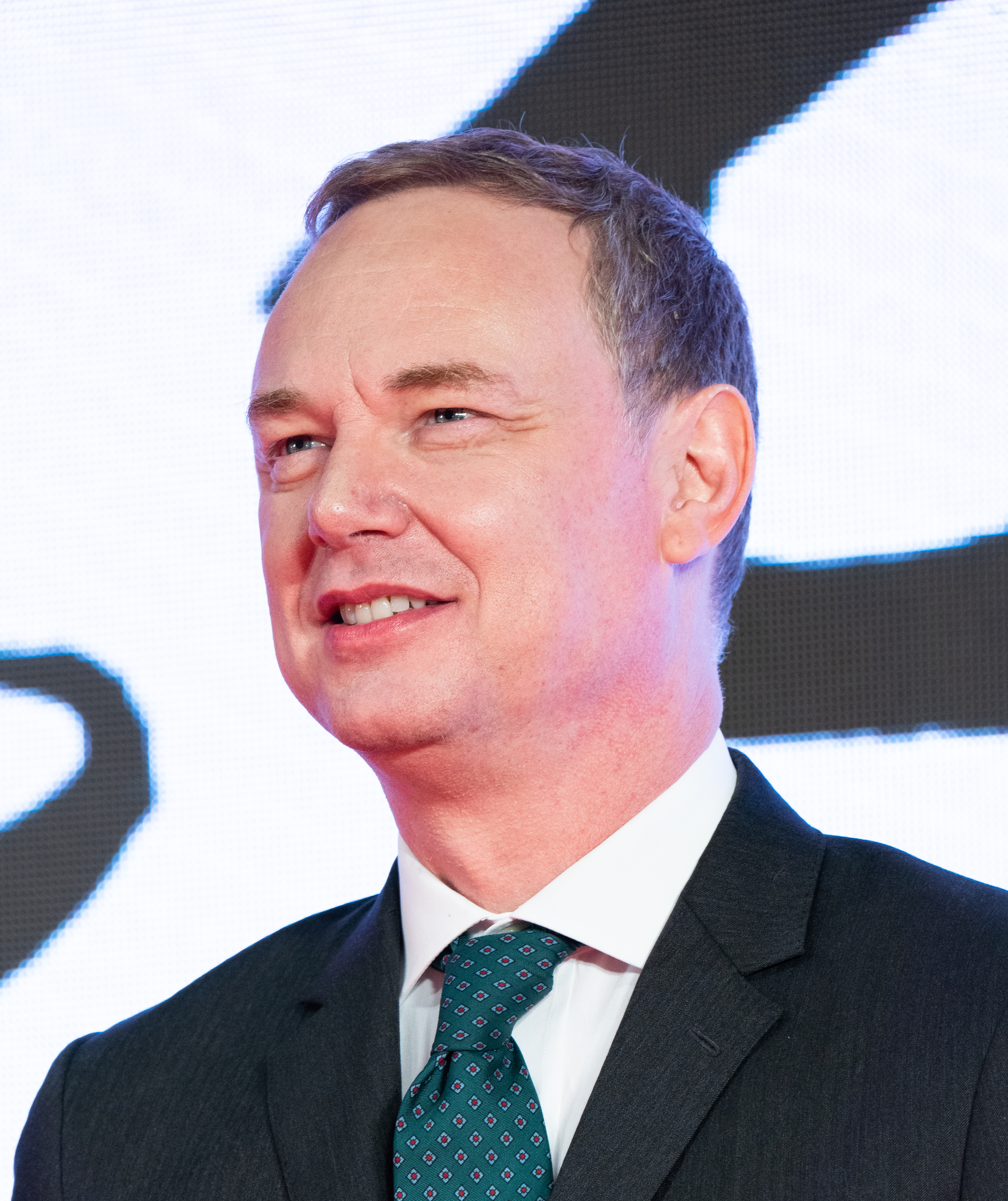
- Westmoreland at the Tokyo International Film Festival in 2019
- Born: 4 March 1966 (age 60); Leeds, England, UK
- Education: University of Newcastle-upon-Tyne; Fukuoka University
- Occupations: Writer, director
- Spouse: Richard Glatzer (m. 2013; died 2015)

Paul "Wash" Westmoreland (born 4 March 1966), previously known professionally as Wash West, is a British director who has worked in television, documentaries, and independent films. He frequently collaborated with his husband, writer-director Richard Glatzer. Together, they wrote and directed the 2014 film Still Alice, based on Lisa Genova's NYT best-selling book and starring Julianne Moore, Kristen Stewart, and Alec Baldwin. The film won many awards, including the Academy Award for Best Actress for Julianne Moore and Humanitas Prize for feature film for the duo. Their 2006 coming-of-age feature film, Quinceañera, won the Audience Award and the Grand Jury Prize at the 2006 Sundance Film Festival.

== Early life and education ==
Westmoreland was born Paul Westmoreland in Leeds, England, on 4 March 1966. Born during Beatlemania, Westmoreland was named after The Beatles band member Paul McCartney and grew up preferring being referred to by his nickname, Wash, as a means of distinguishing himself from all the other Pauls at his school. His father was a maintenance engineer for the CEGB and his mother worked as a receptionist at a local hair salon.

Westmoreland earned his college degree in Politics and East Asian Studies at the University of Newcastle-upon-Tyne and Fukuoka University in Japan, graduating in 1990. He moved to the United States in 1992, initially living in New York City, then moving to New Orleans and finally to Los Angeles in 1995.

== Career ==
=== Early career ===
After working as a camera assistant on Bruce LaBruce's movie Hustler White, Westmoreland entered the adult entertainment world to try to research a feature film project, The Fluffer. He got a job directing for BIG Video, a minor label, and under the name Wash West, he started making movies that challenged the conventional norms of the industry. Dr Jerkoff and Mr Hard and Naked Highway were his first significant films.

Westmoreland directed the cat-and-mouse thriller Animus, sci-fi based Technical Ecstasy, and The Devil is a Bottom, which was listed in the LA Weekly staff's annual list of favorite movies in 2000.

During this time, Westmoreland also started to work in mainstream films. He appeared briefly in Velvet Goldmine by director Todd Haynes. Haynes worked with Westmoreland as a producer on Quinceañera.

=== 2001–2006 ===
Glatzer and Westmoreland's first collaboration was on The Fluffer, a look at obsession, addiction, and power relationships within the gay porn industry. The film starred Michael Cunio, Roxanne Day, Scott Gurney, and Deborah Harry. It premiered at the Berlin and Toronto Film Festivals in 2001 and secured US distribution from First Run Features. It received mixed positive reviews and gained almost instant cult status, John Waters including it in his famous series Ten Movies That Will Corrupt You. Around this time, he gave a candid interview about his experiences in the industry to Terry Gross on NPR's Fresh Air.

Working alone, Westmoreland made a documentary during the 2004 election season, following four Log Cabin Republicans as they responded to President George W. Bush's initiative to alter the US Constitution to ensure that marriage was only legal between a man and a woman. The documentary, Gay Republicans was produced for Andrew Cohen at Bravo, and Fenton Bailey and Randy Barbato at World of Wonder. An extended version of the film premiered at the AFI festival in 2004 to a riotous response. It ended up winning the festival's documentary prize and gaining a distribution deal on DVD.

Made for a budget of under $500,000, and featuring many first-time actors, Quinceañera ended up winning both the Audience Award and the Grand Jury Prize at the 2006 Sundance Film Festival. It went on to win the Humanitas Prize, the John Cassavetes Prize at the Spirit Award in 2007, and many other international film festival prizes. It was picked up for the US by Sony Pictures Classics and distributed in over 25 countries worldwide. The plot focused on a multigenerational Mexican-American family preparing for their daughter's quinceañera against the backdrop of a gentrifying neighbourhood. The film was shot entirely in Echo Park, where the directors live. On release, it received strong positive reviews scoring 87% on Rotten Tomatoes. The lead actress, Emily Rios, went on to have a successful career starring in Friday Night Lights, Breaking Bad, and The Bridge.

=== 2007–2015: Career drought and resurgence ===
After releasing their film Quinceañera in 2006 to critical success at Sundance, Glatzer and Westmoreland found it difficult to secure funding for further projects during the Great Recession. In the interim, they produced Pedro (2008), a film about Pedro Zamora – an AIDS activist cast member on MTV's The Real World in 1993. By 2011, their management had dropped them, however, it was also at this time that Christine Vachon and Pam Koffler of Killer Films had reached out to produce their next projects.

Their first collaboration with Killer Films was on The Last of Robin Hood, which premiered at Toronto International Film Festival in 2013. Glatzer originally heard of a book about Errol Flynn's last love affair The Big Love through his mentor, Jay Presson Allen. Glatzer and Westmoreland started researching the screenplay in 2003, earning the trust of Florence's daughter, Beverly, and the friendship of author Tedd Thomey and Flynn's chauffeur in his final years, Ronnie Shedlo. They wrote the first draft of the screenplay in 2007, but it was not until 2011, and the attachment of Kevin Kline, that things started to move forward. Production took place in Atlanta, GA in 2013. Critical reception was mixed. Several critics praised Kline's performance as Oscar worthy, whereas others seemed confounded by the movie's lack of a moral stance. Julianne Moore had passed on the film but came back later to star in their next feature.

In December 2011, Glatzer and Westmoreland were hired by UK-based producing duo, Lex Lutzus and James Brown, to adapt Lisa Genova's book, Still Alice, about a fifty-year-old linguistics professor who develops early-onset Alzheimer's disease. Glatzer had been diagnosed with ALS a few months prior to accepting the job; he and Westmoreland communicated through an iPad when his physical state had deteriorated.

Julianne Moore was once again their first choice to play the lead. She was soon joined by Kristen Stewart and Kate Bosworth, who had been a long-time fan of the book and had a grandmother who had dementia. Killer Films from The Last of Robin Hood came back on as producers and the movie was picked up by Sony Pictures Classics and released in December 2014. Some critics have suggested a connection between Glatzer's own battle with illness and the raw, honest depiction of illness in the film.

Glatzer died from ALS on 10 March 2015, shortly after Moore won the Academy Award for Best Actress for her performance in this film. She dedicated her award to Glatzer in her acceptance speech.

=== 2015 – present: Solo work ===
Prior to Glatzer's death, Westmoreland had consulted him on which project to pursue next, to which Glatzer typed out "COLETTE". They had written the screenplay for Colette, based on the life of French author Colette, in 2001, after Glatzer expressed interest in her books. However, the project was never picked up, as producers around town cited the LGBTQ love story as too niche. After years of development, it was announced in 2016 that Keira Knightley would star as the titular author. She was later joined by Dominic West, Eleanor Tomlinson, and Denise Gough. The film premiered at the 2018 Sundance Film Festival to a positive reception and later ignited the first all-nighter auction of the fest, with Bleecker Street and 30WEST later partnering on the US rights. It was Westmoreland's first film after Glatzer's passing and his third film produced by Killer Films.

In 2019, Westmoreland was a jury member for the BFI London Film Festival, where his next film Earthquake Bird premiered. Earthquake Bird is a noir thriller about a female expat (Alicia Vikander) in Tokyo, Japan who is suspected of murder when her friend (Riley Keough) goes missing in the wake of a tumultuous love triangle with a local photographer (Naoki Kobayashi). Written and directed by Westmoreland and based on the novel of the same name by Susanna Jones, Earthquake Bird was filmed entirely in Japan. It had a limited theatrical release on 1 November 2019, before moving onto streaming platform, Netflix, on 15 November 2019.

In 2025, Westmoreland was announced as the director of Heartstopper Forever, a film acting as a series finale to the television show Heartstopper.

== Personal life ==
Westmoreland met his directing and writing partner Richard Glatzer in 1995. They were married from September 2013 until Glatzer's death of complications from amyotrophic lateral sclerosis (ALS) on 10 March 2015.

Regarding his father's influence on his career, he stated: "My dad started making films. He worked at the power station all his life, and he was very interested in cinema. He would always show me and my brother films when we were kids and explain. This is a master shot. This is a tracking shot. This is a close-up. And when I was nine, I started making films with our home movie camera with him."
