= Eva Björg Ægisdóttir =

Icelandic writer

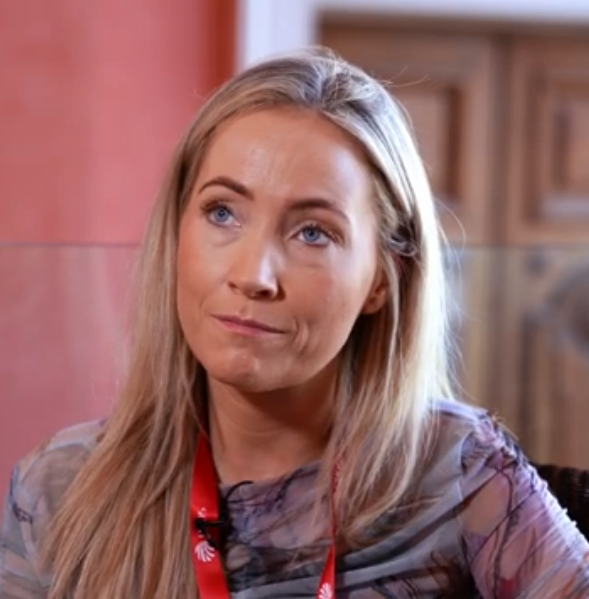
- In a 2025 interview
- Born: 1988 (age 37–38); Akranes, Iceland
- Occupation: Writer

Eva Björg Ægisdóttir (born 1988) is an Icelandic writer. Her novels have been translated into 24 languages, including English, French, German, Dutch, Spanish and Polish.

== Biography ==
Ægisdóttir was born in Akranes, Iceland in 1988. Her literary aspirations were apparent from an early age, when she won a short-story competition at the age of 15. She went to Norway for higher studies, and upon returning to Iceland, decided to write a novel. Her first book The Creak on the Stairs (2018) was a No.1 bestseller in Iceland and won the Icelandic Svart Fuglinn (English: Blackbird Award). The same novel won the British literary award New Blood Dagger in 2021.

Subsequent books in her Forbidden Iceland series include Girls Who Lie and Night Shadows.

Ægisdóttir lives and works in Reykjavík with her family.

== Works ==
=== Forbidden Iceland series ===
- Marrið í stiganum, 2018. (The Creak on the Stairs, 2020.)
- Stelpur sem ljúga, 2019. (Girls Who Lie, 2021.)
- Næturskuggar, 2020. (Night Shadows, 2022.)
- Þú sérð mig ekki, 2022. (You Can't See Me, 2024.) (prequel)
- Strákar sem meiða, 2023. (Boys Who Hurt, 2024.)
- Allar litlu lygarnar, 2025. (The Last Tenant, 2026.)
