= CWA New Blood Dagger =

Literary award

The CWA New Blood Dagger is an annual award given by the British Crime Writers' Association (CWA) for first books by previously unpublished writers. It is given in memory of CWA founder John Creasey and was previously known as the John Creasey Memorial Award.

Publisher Chivers Press was the sponsor from the award's introduction in 1973 to 2002. BBC Audiobooks was the sponsor in 2003.

== Winners ==
Year	Winner	Work	Ref.
1973	Kyril Bonfiglioli	Don't Point That Thing at Me	
1974	Roger L. Simon	The Big Fix	
1975	Sara George	Acid Drop	
1976	Patrick Alexander	Death of a Thin-Skinned Animal	
1977	Jonathan Gash	The Judas Pair	
1978	Paula Gosling	A Running Duck	
1979	David Serafin	Saturday of Glory	
1980	Liza Cody	Dupe	
1981	James Leigh	The Ludi Victory	
1982	Eric Wright	The Night the Gods Smiled	
1983	Carol Clemeau	The Ariadne Clue	
1984	Elizabeth Ironside	A Very Private Enterprise	
1985	Robert Richardson	The Latimer Mercy	
1986	Neville Steed	Tinplate	
1987	Denis Kilcommons	Dark Apostle	
1988	Janet Neel	Death's Bright Angel	
1989	Annette Roome	A Real Shot in the Arm	
1990	Patricia Cornwell	Postmortem	
1991	Walter Mosley	Devil in a Blue Dress	
1992	Minette Walters	The Ice House	
1993	No award		
1994	Doug J. Swanson	Big Town	
1995	Janet Evanovich	One for the Money	
1995	Laurie R. King	A Grave Talent	
1996	No award		
1997	Paul Johnston	Body Politic	
1998	Denise Mina	Garnethill	
1999	Dan Fesperman	Lie in the Dark	
2000	Boston Teran	God Is a Bullet	
2001	Susanna Jones	The Earthquake Bird	
2002	Louise Welsh	The Cutting Room	
2003	William Landay	Mission Flats	
2004	Mark Mills	Amagansett	
2005	Dreda Say Mitchell	Running Hot	
2006	Louise Penny	Still Life	
2007	Gillian Flynn	Sharp Objects	
2008	Matt Rees	The Bethlehem Murders	
2009	Johan Theorin	Echoes from the Dead	
2010	Ryan David Jahn	Acts of Violence	
2011	S. J. Watson	Before I Go to Sleep	
2012	Wiley Cash	A Land More Kind than Home	
2013	Derek B. Miller	Norwegian by Night	
2014	Ray Celestin	The Axeman's Jazz	
2015	Smith Henderson	Fourth of July	
2016	Bill Beverly	Dodgers	
2017	Chris Whitaker	Tall Oaks	
2018	Melissa Scrivner Love	Lola	
2019	Chris Hammer	Scrublands	
2020	Trevor Wood	The Man on the Street	
2021	Eva Björg Ægisdóttir	The Creak on the Stairs	
2022	Janice Hallett	The Appeal	
2023	Hayley Scrivenor	Dirt Town	
2024	Jo Callaghan	Blink of an Eye	
