= Liberty Ross =

English model and actress (born 1978)

- Born: Liberty Lettice Lark Ross; 23 September 1978 (age 48); Hammersmith, London, England
- Occupation: Model
- Spouses: Rupert Sanders (m. 2002; div. 2014) Jimmy Iovine (m. 2016)
- Children: 2
- Relatives: Atticus Ross (brother); Leopold Ross (brother); The 1st Baron Killearn (maternal grandfather); Aldo Castellani (great-grandfather)

Liberty Lettice Lark Ross (born 23 September 1978) is an English model. She has appeared in publications such as Vogue, Harper's Bazaar, i-D, and Dazed & Confused. She is the sister of composers Atticus and Leopold Ross.

== Career ==
=== Modelling ===
Ross met Mario Testino on Portobello Road in London, where he asked her and a group of friends to do a shoot for British Vogue. She worked sporadically as a model throughout her childhood. She appeared on Ozzy Osbourne's album cover for No Rest for the Wicked (1988) at the age of nine. In 1992, she signed with Storm Management.

In 2000, Ross became the face of an Emanuel Ungaro ad campaign. In May, Ross appeared on the twentieth anniversary cover of The Face alongside Kate Moss. In June, Ross appeared on the cover of British Vogue, shot by Testino. Ross was then awarded Model of the Year at the Elle Style Awards.

Ross was photographed by Robin Derrick for the December 2000/January 2001 issue of Vogue Russia. In 2001, she was the primary model in the ad campaign for Levi's Engineered Jeans. In January 2002, Ross was again featured on the cover of British Vogue, also photographed by Testino, alongside nine other British models including Kate Moss, Naomi Campbell, Stella Tennant and Erin O'Connor. Later that year, Ross shot Burberry's spring campaign alongside Kate Moss and Eva Herzigova, and also appeared on the November 2002 cover of British magazine i-D, photographed by Kayt Jones.

In 2003, Ross became the face of the luxury footwear brand Jimmy Choo. She also modelled for the cover of Vogue Russia, photographed by Todd Barry.

In 2004, she modelled for Dior's Addict perfume. Ross then appeared in the Pirelli Calendar, photographed by Nick Knight. Shortly after, Ross began a three-year hiatus to focus on her family life that ended in 2007 when she re-signed with Storm.

=== Return to modelling ===
Following her husband's well publicized affair, Ross began to stage a career comeback, appearing on the cover of online magazine The Edit and in the pages of Vanity Fair. Ross made her runway return in September 2012, walking for Alexander Wang at New York Fashion Week.

=== Other projects ===
Ross was a frequent collaborator with SHOWstudio appearing in multiple short films and projects.

Ross also contributed to British Vogue's online blog from 2009 to 2012.

In 2014, Ross was invited to design a capsule collection for Genetic Denim which was sold exclusively at Net-a-Porter.

== Personal life ==
Ross married director Rupert Sanders in 2002. Though both Ross and Sanders are British, they moved to Los Angeles to further Sanders' career, and Ross focused on being a wife and mother. Together, they have two children, a daughter and a son. In July 2012, Us Weekly published photos of Sanders cheating on Ross with actress Kristen Stewart, prompting Sanders and Stewart to issue separate public apologies. Ross subsequently filed for divorce from Sanders in January 2013, seeking joint custody, spousal support, and legal fees. The divorce was finalised on 30 May 2014.

In 2014, Ross confirmed she was dating record producer Jimmy Iovine. They married on Valentine's Day, 2016, in California at the home of music producer David Geffen.

Ross has five siblings, including brothers Leopold Ross and Atticus Ross. She is the granddaughter of Miles Lampson. She is of Italian heritage through her great-grandfather, Aldo Castellani.

== Filmography ==
Films credits
Year	Title	Role	Notes
2004	Enchantement	Natasha	Short film
2009	Thinly Veiled	Shelby Sommer	
2010	Lipstick Lies	Model	Short film
2011	Daydream	Woman	Short film
2011	Packing Heat	Femme Fatale	Short film
2011	W.E.	Connie Thaw	
2012	Dollywood	Model	Short film
2012	Snow White and the Huntsman	Queen Eleanor	
2015	Sweetheart	Nicole	Short film
