= Claudia Sarne =

English musician and composer

- Born: 18 December 1969 (age 56); Los Angeles, California
- Occupation: Musician
- Years active: 2004–present
- Spouse: Atticus Ross
- Children: 3

Claudia Sarne (born 18 December 1969) is a British-American composer whose work blends electronic textures, orchestral writing, and innovative sound design. Known for her versatile musical voice, she became the first woman to score a DC Comics feature film, Supergirl.

== Early career ==
Claudia Sarne was signed as a songwriter initially and in 1994 started working with Atticus Ross under the band name 12 Rounds. They signed a recording deal with Polydor records and released a 4 track EP followed by a full length album called "Jitter Juice". This led them to be introduced to Trent Reznor and they moved over to Nothing Records/Interscope in 1996. They released an album called "My Big Hero" in 1998 and toured extensively.

12 Rounds recorded a 3rd unreleased album and moved to America to tour and support the record. Ultimately it was never released but director Allen Hughes heard the record and thus Sarne began a career in film and TV.

Sarne began her film and TV composing career collaborating with Atticus Ross and Leopold Ross, co-scoring the television series Touching Evil (2004), starring Jeffrey Donovan and Vera Farmiga. Following that project, director Allen Hughes invited the trio to score The Book of Eli, launching her career in film and television music.

Her credits include the acclaimed Netflix anthology series Black Mirror; television series such as Outcast, The Defiant Ones, Dispatches from Elsewhere, Dear Mama, Shining Girls, and The Yogurt Shop Murders; the award-winning documentary Love + War; and feature films including Earthquake Bird, A Million Little Pieces, Corazón, Broken City, and Triple 9.

== Personal life ==
Sarne and her husband, musician and composer Atticus Ross, split their time between London and Los Angeles.

== Discography ==
=== Film ===
Year	Title	Director	Studio(s)	Notes
2008	New York, I Love You	Various	Vivendi Entertainment	Segment #6; Composed with Atticus Ross and Leopold Ross
2010	The Book of Eli	Hughes brothers	Warner Bros. Pictures; Summit Entertainment	Composed with Atticus Ross and Leopold Ross
2011	Days of Grace	Everardo Gout	ARP Sélection	Composed with Nick Cave, Warren Ellis, Leopold Ross, Atticus Ross & Shigeru Umebayashi
2013	Broken City	Allen Hughes	20th Century Fox	Composed with Atticus Ross and Leopold Ross
2014	Love & Mercy	Bill Pohlad	Lionsgate; Roadside Attractions	
2016	Triple 9	John Hillcoat	Open Road Films	Composed with Bobby Krlic, Leopold Ross and Atticus Ross
2018	A Million Little Pieces	Sam Taylor-Johnson	Entertainment One	Composed with Leopold Ross and Atticus Ross
2018	Corazón	John Hillcoat	Serial Pictures	Composed with Leopold Ross and Atticus Ross
2019	Earthquake Bird	Wash Westmoreland	Netflix	Composed with Leopold Ross and Atticus Ross
2024	Lost in the Jungle	Jimmy Chin, Juan Camilo Cruz, Elizabeth Chai Vasarhelyi	National Geographic	
2025	Love+War	Jimmy Chin, Elizabeth Chai Vasarhelyi	National Geographic	
2026	Supergirl	Craig Gillespie	Warner Bros.	

=== Television ===
Year	Title	Original channel(s)	Notes
2004	Touching Evil	USA Network	Composed with Atticus Ross and Leopold Ross
2016–2017	Outcast	Cinemax	Composed with Atticus Ross and Leopold Ross
2017	The Defiant Ones	HBO	Composed with Atticus Ross and Leopold Ross
2017	Black Mirror	Netflix	"Crocodile" (season 4, episode 3); Composed with Atticus Ross and Leopold Ross
2020	Dispatches from Elsewhere	AMC	Composed with Atticus Ross and Leopold Ross
2021	Animal Kingdom	TNT	Main Title Theme, composed with Atticus Ross
2022	Shining Girls	Apple TV	
2023	Dear Mama	FX	Composed with Atticus Ross and Leopold Ross
2025	The Yogurt Shop Murders	HBO Max	

== Awards and nominations ==
- 2011 — Black Reel Awards — Best Original Score — The Book of Eli (nominee)
- 2012 — Guadalajara International Film Festival — Best Original Score — Days of Grace (winner)
- 2012 — Ariel Awards — Best Score — Days of Grace (winner)
- 2025 — Critics Choice Documentary Awards — Best Score — Love+War (nominee)
