= Touching Evil (American TV series) =

American crime drama television series

- Genre: Crime drama
- Based on: Touching Evil by Paul Abbott
- Starring: Jeffrey Donovan; Vera Farmiga; Kevin Durand; Zach Grenier; Brian Markinson
- Music by: Atticus Ross; Leopold Ross; Claudia Sarne
- Country of origin: United States
- Original language: English
- No. of seasons: 1
- No. of episodes: 13

Production
- Executive producers: Bruce Willis; Arnold Rifkin; Hughes brothers; Robert Palm; Antony Root
- Producer: James Bigwood
- Production locations: Vancouver, British Columbia
- Running time: 42 minutes
- Production companies: Granada America; Cheyenne Enterprises; USA Cable Entertainment

Original release
- Network: USA Network
- Release: March 12 – June 14, 2004

Touching Evil is an American crime drama television series, based on the British series of the same name created by Paul Abbott. It starred Jeffrey Donovan as Detective David Creegan and Vera Farmiga as Creegan's partner Detective Susan Branca. Brian Markinson, Kevin Durand and Zach Grenier co-starred. The premise of this adaptation was somewhat different from the UK series' storyline. Rather than acquiring the ability to sense criminals, Creegan's recovery from a gunshot wound to the head instead strips him of his impulse control and sense of shame.

The series was produced by USA Cable Entertainment, Granada America and actor Bruce Willis' production company Cheyenne Enterprises, and premiered on March 12, 2004. It ran for 13 episodes, ending on June 14, 2004. Although Touching Evil garnered acclaim from television critics, the USA Network deemed it commercially unsuccessful and opted not to renew the series for a second season.

== Plot ==
Returning from a year-long psychological leave of absence after surviving an almost-fatal gunshot wound to the head, San Francisco Detective David Creegan (Jeffrey Donovan) is assigned to the FBI's Organized and Serial Crime Unit – a rapid-response, elite crime investigation squad – where he and his new partner, Detective Susan Branca (Vera Farmiga), find themselves committed to saving lives and solving cases. In spite of his inability to abide by common sense and the laws he is sworn to uphold, Creegan, with the help of Branca, works on hunting down the most vicious criminals on the streets.

== Cast ==
=== Main ===
- Jeffrey Donovan as Detective David Creegan
- Vera Farmiga as Detective Susan Branca
- Kevin Durand as Special Agent Jay Swopes
- Zach Grenier as Special Agent Hank Enright
- Brian Markinson as Special Agent Charles Bernal

=== Recurring ===
- Larissa Tewson as Samantha Creegan
- Sydney Tewson as Lily Creegan
- Leila Johnson as Holly Creegan
- Bradley Cooper as OSC Agent Mark Rivers
- Pruitt Taylor Vince as Cyril Kemp
- Peter Wingfield as OSC Agent Jon Krakauer
- Christopher Redman as Ben Rivers
- D. Neil Mark as OSC Agent Garrett
- Veena Sood as OSC Agent Sattrah
- Devon Weigel as Emily Akins

== Episodes ==
No.	Title	Directed by	Written by	Original release date
1 2	"Pilot"	Allen Hughes	Bruno Heller	March 12, 2004
David Creegan goes to arrest a man but is shot in the head and falls out of a window. He dies, but comes back to life. Three years later, he rejoins the police and is partnered with Susan Branca. Their first assignment is the disappearance of three boys. They deduce that the kidnapper leaves a flower at each crime scene. Creegan and Branca find a suspect and chase him. However, after questioning, they realize he is not their man. They talk to Ronald Hinks, who gives them a statement. Creegan knows Hinks is their guy, but is unable to prove it. Creegan talks to Cyril Kemp, the man they apprehended, and he points out Hinks from a series of photos. Creegan and Branca manage to arrest Hinks, but he is soon released. The OSC checks Hinks' house and garage but do not find any of the boys. Creegan carries out an illegal interrogation with Hinks and, in the process, gives Hinks a nose bleed. Creegan takes the bloodied handkerchief and Hinks' dog to an abandoned building they searched previously; the dog leads him to where the boys are being held. The evidence is still too weak to arrest Hinks, so Creegan goes to his house to kill him. However, Hinks is already dead.
3	"Y Me"	Rachel Talalay	Michael Angeli	March 19, 2004
A woman is burned to death with strange markings on her body, which draws similarities to a previous victim. Creegan and Branca investigate, and think their perpetrator is man obsessed with fire. However, when questioning their main suspect, former arsonist Richard Simon, Creegan deduces that he isn't their man. Simon is at his own apartment when a third attack takes place. The detectives reexamine their victims and find out that they were all related to Lynn Noll, a pregnant woman with leukemia who was friends with the second victim. Creegan and Branca manage to stop Lynn before she sets a fourth victim ablaze. Meanwhile, Creegan tries to overcome his insomnia.
4	"Justine"	Allen Hughes	Ronald D. Moore	March 26, 2004
Three women are found beaten to death outside of a strip club. All three were dressed like Justine Hazelton, a former prostitute serving time for murdering six pimps in the early 1990s. When Creegan and Branca visit Justine in prison, she gives them letters from various people. Meanwhile, Creegan realizes that Agent Krakauer killed Hinks. Krakauer confesses, however, there is not enough evidence to convict him. He says he did it to protect his newborn daughter, but tells Creegan that she was born braindead. The detectives find out that the killer of the three women is a pen pal of Justine named Leonard Cavanaugh. They then use Justine as bait to arrest him. At the police station, Krakauer is released from duty, but before leaving the premises, he takes Bernal's gun and kills Cavanaugh. He is then willingly apprehended by the officers.
5	"Slash 30"	Karen Moncrieff	Anna Fricke	April 2, 2004
Agent Rivers replaces Krakauer in the unit. The team are searching for a serial killer, nicknamed the Hangman. Stephen Laney, a reporter and a former acquaintance of Branca's, has been following the Hangman's murder spree for a year. The officers catch the Hangman, but he reveals that Laney has been giving information to him about possible victims. Branca sleeps with Laney, unaware of his involvement in the murders, while Creegan searches his apartment. The next day, Branca is shocked to find out about Laney when he is brought in for questioning by the agents. Later, after Laney is released, he strangles a waitress and breaks into Branca's house. He taunts Branca about her fiancé's suicide and attempts to kill her, but can't go through with it. Creegan and Rivers race to Branca's apartment. When Laney raises the gun, Rivers shoots him.
6	"Memorial"	Rose Troche	Rob Wright	April 16, 2004
The bodies of three men are found at a monument. They all have the same heart tattoo and drilled holes in their heads. Rivers and Bernal investigate the tattoos. Frank Desipio, an ex-soldier who Creegan discovers at the monument, tells him that members of his army unit got the tattoos after serving together in Iraq. The detectives conclude that Desipio isn't the killer, but warn him that he could be the next target. Desipio says he can protect himself, but eventually becomes the killer's fourth victim. The OSC research the remaining members of the army unit and become suspicious of Mike Espy. Espy wanted to relieve his friends of the pain they experienced in the army by performing lobotomies on them. He attempts to kill a fifth member of the unit, but the detectives intervene.
7	"K"	Greg Yaitanes	John McLaughlin & Robert Palm	April 23, 2004
Four teenagers mutilate horses and film their antics, but one of them backs out. The OSC intervenes as they think that whoever attacked the horses will eventually kill people. They believe the culprit is James Stoker, a man who tortured animals for fun but hasn't been caught for killing people. They search for Stoker in his house, but a planted bomb goes off and an officer is killed. A ticket is found at the site of three mutilated homeless men. Cyril had witnessed the killings and called Creegan. The teens now think they're big shots and get high on K. The three turn on the boy who backed out and chase him, but Creegan and Branca get to him first. The boy eventually gives up his friends. Two of them also confess to the crime, but the third, named Jack, has something to show the detectives. Jack shows them where he left Stoker, and he tells them that he planted the bomb.
8	"Love Lies Bleeding"	Rod Hardy	Jeff Vlaming	April 30, 2004
A girl named Emily Akins is murdered, and the suspect is Mr. Clean, a serial killer who is out on parole but is missing. Emily's father, Martin, blames Creegan for her death, because the police didn't inform the media that a convicted killer had been released from prison. Martin tells Creegan's daughters that it was their father who killed his daughter. He then sends Creegan a home video of Emily and sets Creegan's family's house on fire. Meanwhile, the OSC tracks down Mr. Clean to a motel and the officers arrest him after a short chase. Creegan visits Emily's grave and arrests Martin for arson. As a result, Creegan requests that his family be relocated so that future criminals don't put them in danger. Holly and his daughters then leave for Virginia. It is then revealed that Enright was acquainted with one of Mr. Clean's previous victims.
9	"Attachment"	Rod Hardy	Michael Angeli & Anna Fricke & Tracey Stern	May 10, 2004
A couple is found shot in their own home, but their son is missing. The murder of the Armstrongs is connected to a string of murders done by a man nicknamed the Morning Person. They find the couple's boy, Eddie, with a woman named Abby Korchinoff, who claims that Eddie is her son. After a DNA test, it is revealed that she is indeed his mother, and her son was stolen from her by a Ukrainian adoption agency. An interpol agent comes and asks for the detectives' help with the matter; Branca, who can speak Ukrainian, is sent to infiltrate the agency while the rest of the team try to find the Morning Person (also known as Mikhael Slansky), the head of the child-smuggling ring. In exchange for getting her son, Abby tells the OSC about Slansky, and she and Creegan become intimate. Branca "adopts" a child named Dora, and when it is time to give her to the U.S. authorities, she flees. Creegan and Abby are attacked by Slansky, but they manage to apprehend him. Branca is given the week off because of her actions. Meanwhile, Creegan also deals with the fact that his kids are gone.
10	"Boston"	Rob Bailey	Michael Angeli	May 17, 2004
A string of murders lead the OSC to Boston, which is Creegan's hometown. A priest, Father Bob Di Fabian (Robert Cicchini), is in confession with a man when the man tries to kill him. The man, dubbed the Blade Runner, has committed five other murders. Bob tells the detectives everything that the Blade Runner told him in the confession booth, but Branca doesn't believe it because of her past experiences with Catholicism. The neighborhood watch had received a photo of one of the victims by email, and another comes in with a message telling them that he won't stop until the ringing in his head stops. Creegan thinks the perpetrator is a man with tinnitus. As a result, they arrest a medic with tinnitus, Sammy Rashaad, who was present at four of the murder scenes. Rashaad is released on the account that he has alibis for each murder. Creegan talks to Father Bob again and realizes their suspect is a mailman with a dislike for religion. They search Frederick Stentz's house and find that he is indeed the Blade Runner. Branca goes to Father Bob, only to find him knocked out, shortly after, Stentz knocks her out as well. He is about to kill Branca, but Creegan arrives in time to save her.
11	"Entropy"	David Von Ancken	Anna Fricke	May 24, 2004
A man is killed in a knife attack. The OSC thinks the suspect is 6 foot tall, heavy-set with a mental illness, like Creegan's friend Cyril. Creegan tries to prove that the culprit isn't Cyril, but is unable to find him. Eventually, Creegan finds him, but finds out that Cyril is not taking his medication and is not competent. Creegan lets him go. Another body is found, and this time, Cyril is given his medicine. He tells Creegan that it is his friend Spencer who said he was "going to take them home". Spencer is arrested and Cyril is sent to a medical institution. Meanwhile, Rivers deals with his junkie brother Ben, and Agent Bernal causes a little friction between him and Creegan.
12	"Grief"	Michael Robison	Robert Palm	June 7, 2004
A man finds his wife's dead body in the trunk of his car, with her heart removed. Branca, Rivers and Enright travel to Port Endicott, Oregon where there have been similar cases. They investigate the victims' husbands, a burglar who broke into each of the victims' houses weeks before the murders, and a police officer, but none of their suspects match the crime. It appears that the case will go unsolved, but Creegan arrives and realizes that the murderer is the grief counselor, Dr. Warren Robbins, who carries out the killings because he wants to provide comfort to the people grieving them. Meanwhile, Rivers' brother arrives in Port Endicott, but is later found dead. Rivers visits the Robbins to deal with his brother's death and is almost killed, but Branca and Creegan arrive in time to rush him to the hospital. Creegan's family returns.
13	"Mercy"	Allen Hughes	Tommy Thompson	June 14, 2004
Three ICU patients die in a hospital, with all three of them having doxygen in their systems (a drug that speeds up the heart rate) and the words "let me go back" written on the backs of their necks. The detectives investigate the doctor who oversaw the patients and the janitor, but Creegan concludes that the killer has had a near-death experience of their own. He puts a card on the bulletin that he thinks would attract that kind of person. However, before Creegan finds out who looked at the card, another patient dies. It is then revealed that Judith Carny, the anaesthesiologist, is the murderer, and she has drugged Creegan. Branca arrives and resuscitates him. Once Creegan gets out of the hospital, Carny calls him and tells him that three more patients will die unless he comes to her and tells her what it is like on the other side. Creegan arrives to find Carny about to kill herself. He talks to her and finds out the patients names, but Carny injects herself with doxygen. Creegan manages to resuscitate her. Afterwards, Creegan and Branca take a walk along the coast.
