= The Earthquake Bird =

2001 novel by Susanna Jones

- First edition
- Author: Susanna Jones
- Language: English
- Publisher: Picador
- Publication date: 2001
- Publication place: United Kingdom
- Media type: Print
- Pages: 224
- Awards: John Llewellyn Rhys Prize; Betty Trask Award; CWA New Blood Dagger
- ISBN: 0-330-48501-6

The Earthquake Bird is the 2001 debut novel by British author Susanna Jones. It won the John Llewellyn Rhys Prize, a Betty Trask Award, and the Crime Writers' Association John Creasy Dagger. The novel was later adapted by Wash Westmoreland into a film called Earthquake Bird, which was released by Netflix in November 2019.

== Plot ==
The story opens in a Tokyo police station where 34-year-old Lucy Fly is being questioned over the murder of her friend and fellow British expatriate Lily Bridges. Lucy has been in Tokyo for 10 years, is fluent in Japanese, and employed in translating manuals into English. She is evasive in her answers to the police but recounts to the readers what led to her current situation: her estrangement from her family in England, her relationship with Teiji, an enigmatic photographer, and the recent arrival of Lily.

Through flashbacks, we learn that Lucy grew up in East Yorkshire as the youngest child and only daughter of a family of eight children. Lucy was neglected by her parents and bullied by her older brothers. She nearly drowns in the sea without her family noticing, and during a later childhood incident, her older brothers hurl objects at her while she is reading on a tree. Lucy accidentally kills her eldest brother Noah by jumping on him from the tree, causing him to fall onto a nail. Lucy is further traumatised by the incident, which only serves to estrange her further from her family and from other people. She studies foreign languages including French and Japanese, deliberately distancing herself further from her provincial family. Following her university studies, Lucy moves to Japan to work as a translator.

While living in Japan, Lucy befriends Teiji, who works in a noodle shop by day and takes photographs at night, after a chance encounter in the street which leads to casual sex. Lucy quickly develops strong feelings for the enigmatic stranger. Separately, American expatriate Bob introduces Lucy to fellow British expatriate Lily, who also hails from East Yorkshire and is fleeing an abusive relationship back home. Lily is the only one of Lucy's friends to meet Teiji, whom she ordinarily tries to keep to herself.

When Lily decides to return home to her abuser, Lucy manipulates her into staying in Japan with the promise of a trip to Sado Island. Teiji decides to accompany them unannounced and a love triangle develops. Lily disappears and is reported missing after a heated argument at Lucy's flat, which leads to Lucy's arrest and questioning which opens the novel after a dismembered body believed to be Lily's washes up in Tokyo Bay. Unknown to Lucy, the dismembered body proves to be misidentified, but shortly after Lily's actual body is found near Lucy's home. In a fit of contrition Lucy falsely confesses to the murder, but she is cleared when CCTV footage shows Lily alive several hours after the supposed time of death - and meeting Teiji, who has disappeared. Lucy is released, and as she recuperates at her friend's house, she believes she hears the clicking of his camera's shutter, and the novel ends unresolved.

== Reception ==
Reviews were generally positive:

- A. N. Wilson in The Daily Telegraph writes "Without giving away the secret, Lucy is obsessed, sexually obsessed, by a young man called Teiji who works in a noodle bar, and who likes taking arty photographs of tall buildings reflected in the puddles of Tokyo's pavements, and of her in the nude. In its spare way, this novel, which I have now read three times, is one of the best accounts - and this is not all that it is - of female sexuality, that subject of and mystery for any male reader. It is not, very decidedly not, a book however which will reveal what 'they' feel when in love, or in bed - only what she, and a pretty distinctive she, feels."
- Publishers Weekly concludes "The descriptions of Japan's landscapes, language, people and customs are delivered with fluency and intimacy, yet with the slightly detached clarity of an expat. Some readers may find Jones's intermingling of first- and third-person narration self-conscious and distracting...and the hazy ending raises more questions than it answers. But this is less a whodunit than an examination of the slippery nature of truth and memory, obsessions and betrayals, all of which Jones handles with confidence and skill"
