= Io Echo =

American indie rock band

Io Echo was an American indie rock band formed in Los Angeles by Ioanna Gika and Leopold Ross. Their debut album, Ministry of Love, was released in 2013 on Iamsound in the US. Previously, the band released the single "While You Were Sleeping" in 2010 and a self-titled EP in 2012 on the same label. Io Echo's style combines rock music compositions with instruments such as a Japanese koto harp and Chinese violins. Io Echo were hand-picked by Trent Reznor to open for Nine Inch Nails at the last show of their Wave Goodbye Tour. Io Echo have also composed the score to the Harmony Korine and James Franco film project Rebel. In 2013, the band played Coachella, Lollapalooza, South by South West and toured with Bloc Party and Garbage. As well as recording and touring, after seeing them perform live Jeffrey Deitch asked the band to curate an audio visual festival at the Museum of Modern Art Los Angeles. Io Echo named it PLAY MOCA and played alongside Salem, Cults, Zola Jesus, Active Child, and more.

Gika and Ross were introduced by a friend and bonded over a mutual love for the Velvet Underground, in particular the song “Venus in Furs”. They released the EP Io Echo in October 2012. While working on their debut album, the band opened for The Big Pink, Florence + the Machine, the Drums, Nine Inch Nails, and Garbage. Leopold Ross also played bass for The Big Pink.

Their recent release was the 2017 single "Harm". Ioanna Gika now records as a solo artist for Sargent House. Earlier in the year, they composed the song "Aokigahara Forest" for Ghost in the Shell (Music Inspired by the Motion Picture).

== Members ==
- Ioanna Gika - vocals, guitar, piano, koto harp
- Leopold Ross - bass, programming
- Michael Edelstein - guitar
- Paul Rinis - drums

== Discography ==
- "Doorway" single (2009)
- "While You Are Sleeping" single (Iamsound, 2010)
- Io Echo EP (LuvLuvLuv Records, 2012)
- Io Echo EP (Iamsound, 2012)
- Ministry of Love (Iamsound, 2013)
- I've Been Vaping Your Tears (EP, 2014)
- Crossing Over (single, with Lawless, 2016)
- Ghost in the Shell (Music Inspired by the Motion Picture) (compilation, Paramount Pictures Corporation, 2017)
- Harm (single, Sargent House, 2017)
