= Triple 9 =

2016 film by John Hillcoat

- Theatrical release poster
- Directed by: John Hillcoat
- Written by: Matt Cook
- Produced by: Keith Redmon; Bard Dorros; Marc Butan; Anthony Katagas; Christopher Woodrow; John Hillcoat
- Starring: Casey Affleck; Chiwetel Ejiofor; Anthony Mackie; Aaron Paul; Clifton Collins Jr.; Norman Reedus; Gal Gadot; Woody Harrelson; Kate Winslet
- Cinematography: Nicolas Karakatsanis
- Edited by: Dylan Tichenor
- Music by: Atticus Ross; Claudia Sarne; Leopold Ross; Bobby Krlic
- Production companies: Worldview Entertainment; Sierra Pictures; Anonymous Content; MadRiver Pictures; SureFire Capital
- Distributed by: Open Road Films
- Release dates: February 16, 2016 (Los Angeles); February 26, 2016 (United States)
- Running time: 116 minutes
- Country: United States
- Language: English
- Budget: $20 million
- Box office: $25.9 million

Triple 9 is a 2016 American heist action thriller film directed by John Hillcoat and written by Matt Cook. The film stars an ensemble cast featuring Casey Affleck, Chiwetel Ejiofor, Anthony Mackie, Aaron Paul, Clifton Collins Jr., Norman Reedus, Teresa Palmer, Michael K. Williams, Gal Gadot, Woody Harrelson, and Kate Winslet.

Triple 9 was released in the United States on February 26, 2016, by Open Road Films. The film received mixed reviews from critics and grossed $25 million against its $20 million production budget.

== Plot ==
An Atlanta criminal crew consisting of former Navy SEALs Michael Atwood and Russell Welch, Russell's ex-cop brother Gabe, and corrupt APD detectives Marcus Belmont and Franco Rodriguez, rob a bank to retrieve a safe deposit box, which contains information that could overturn the recent conviction of a Jewish-Russian Mafia boss. When Michael brings the safe deposit box to the boss's wife, Irina, she withholds their reward money and gives Michael and his crew another mission, which involves breaking into a DHS office and stealing more data on her husband. To convince them to take the job, the mafia tortures and then dumps a mortally wounded Russell off in front of the crew, forcing Michael to mercy-kill Russell in front of them.

The group decides to go forward with the job, and Marcus and Franco suggest a Triple 9 scenario, which involves an "officer down" call that sends all of the police to the location of the incident, with Marcus nominating his new partner, Chris Allen, a Marine veteran, as the cop to be killed. Marcus tries to befriend Chris as they go out on calls together. During one call, Chris attempts to question a local gang member, Luis Pinto, about a gang-related homicide, only for Luis to attack Chris before being detained. Chris's uncle, Jeffrey Allen, a detective in the police working on the bank robbery case, gets a lead and discovers that Gabe is involved in the bank robbery. Gabe, still grieving over his brother, tries to stop the heist from happening by following Chris and Marcus around and telling Chris but is stopped by both Michael and Jeffrey.

On the day of the heist, Marcus takes Chris to an abandoned housing project to meet an informant with information on their homicide case. As they walk around the building, Marcus slips away, and Luis comes in and tries to find Chris. Chris bumps into Gabe who tries to warn him that he is going to die. Luis then charges in and tries to shoot Chris but hits Gabe. As Luis runs away, Chris confronts a critically wounded Gabe. Before Gabe can say anything, Marcus comes in, triggering a shootout between the two. Gabe is killed, and Marcus is shot in the head. Fearing Marcus is dead, Chris makes the Triple 9 call. Thinking his nephew is the officer down, Jeffrey rushes to the scene. Meanwhile, Michael and Franco break into the office and steal the information. Luis flees the projects and is later shot dead by SWAT after barricading himself in a nearby home.

In the aftermath, Marcus survives but is in critical condition. Michael meets with Irina for the exchange. He has a gift for his son to give to him upon their reunion. Irina gives him the money but does not bring Michael's son as she had promised to earlier. Michael and Irina were earlier revealed to have a family relationship: the mother of Michael's son is Irina's sister. After being beaten, Michael walks back to his car and triggers a bomb that was wired into his "gift," killing Irina. As he drives away, Michael is pulled over by Franco, who kills him and steals the money.

After investigating Luis's belongings at the morgue, Chris finds a note in Luis's wallet, which contains the location where Marcus took him the day of the shooting. Chris later finds out that Marcus met Luis on the day of the shooting, letting him know where to kill Chris. Angered, Chris visits an unconscious Marcus to try to get answers but is interrupted by Franco, who invites Chris back to the station to get his account of the shooting. As the two head to the car, Chris receives a call from Jeffrey, who tells him that Franco has been cleaning the house and that he might be next. Chris stops and tells Franco that he'll meet him at the station. Franco, realizing Chris has been tipped off his involvement, agrees to meet Chris there. As the two head out to their respective cars, Jeffrey is seen in the backseat of Franco's car, and they both shoot each other when Franco takes a seat in his car. Franco is killed, and Jeffrey is shot in the abdomen. As Chris makes a Triple 9 call, Jeffrey calmly pulls a joint and smokes it, leaving his fate unknown.

== Cast ==
- Casey Affleck as Det. Chris Allen, Jeffrey's nephew and Michelle's husband
- Anthony Mackie as Det. Marcus Belmont, a corrupt police officer
- Chiwetel Ejiofor as Michael Atwood, a career criminal
- Clifton Collins Jr. as Det. Franco Rodriguez, another corrupt officer
- Woody Harrelson as Sgt. Jeffrey Allen, Chris' uncle
- Aaron Paul as Gabriel "Gabe" Welch, Russell's brother
- Kate Winslet as Irina Vlaslov, a Russian crime lord and Elena's sister
- Gal Gadot as Elena Vlaslov, Irina's sister
- Norman Reedus as Russell Welch, Gabe's brother
- Teresa Palmer as Michelle Allen, Chris' wife
- Michael K. Williams as "Sweet Pea"
- Michelle Ang as Det. Trina Ling
- Luis Da Silva as Luis Pinto
- E. Roger Mitchell as Smith

== Production ==
=== Development ===
The project was first announced in August 2010 with director John Hillcoat circling Matt Cook's crime drama script Triple Nine, set to star Shia LaBeouf, with Steve Golin attached to produce. Cook's script was included in the 2010 Black List of most-liked unproduced scripts. Hillcoat confirmed his direction of the film later in May 2012; the casting of LaBeouf and Nick Cave scoring the music for the film were also confirmed. Later, Cave left the project and Atticus Ross came on board to compose the score for the film. In February 2014 Open Road Films acquired the US distribution rights to the film and Worldview Entertainment came on board to finance the film after the exit of Panorama Media.

=== Casting ===
The film went through many casting changes. Shia LaBeouf was initially attached to star in the film but later left the project and was replaced by Charlie Hunnam. In December 2013, Hunnam also left the project and was replaced by Casey Affleck. In August 2013, Cate Blanchett and Christoph Waltz were in talks to join the cast but later dropped out and instead Kate Winslet and Woody Harrelson came on board. Casting completed in March 2014, as Aaron Paul, Norman Reedus, Chiwetel Ejiofor, Casey Affleck, Anthony Mackie, Gal Gadot, Teresa Palmer, and Clifton Collins Jr. rounded out the cast.

Hillcoat talking about the filming schedule said, "It's a challenge, arranging everyone's schedules and trying to accomplish something with eight main characters. I've never worked on something quite like this."

=== Filming ===
Principal photography began on May 28, 2014, in Atlanta, Georgia. On June 5, filming took place at St. Regis in Buckhead, Atlanta, with Winslet. Filming took place at Centennial Olympic Park Drive, Atlanta from June 23 to June 25, 2014. In early July, filming moved to Decatur, scenes were shot from July 9–12, 2014 in the 200 block of Kings Highway. Additionally, stretches of Ansley Street and Kings Highway were also used as establishing shots. Scenes were also shot on White Street, South East of Westview Cemetery, Atlanta. On July 17, 2014, a scene was shot in Atlanta with real paramedics, SWAT officers and police officers along with the principal cast. Due to heavy rain, some scenes remained unfinished while shooting at Centennial Olympic Park, where filming again took place from August 5–6, 2014. After that, filming was wrapped.

== Music ==
Atticus Ross composed the music for the film along with his wife Claudia Sarne, brother Leopold Ross and Bobby Krlic. Talking about the music of the film, Ross said that "he [Hillcoat] had a particular vision for the music on this movie which was very raw sounding electronics; with bizarrely a saxophone in there. With this film, it was difficult because we were trying to get the story right and one would write the music, but then the scenes would change around and it all becomes redundant. So it was quite a bit of work." A foreboding version of This Little Piggy was featured in the trailer of the film.

== Release ==
On August 27, 2014, Open Road set the film for a nationwide release on September 11, 2015. But on June 10, 2015, it was announced the release date of the film has moved from September 11, 2015, to March 4, 2016. In October 2015, the release date was moved up to February 26, 2016.

=== Promotion ===
The first trailer for the film was released on October 5, 2015.

=== Home media ===
Triple 9 was released on DVD and Blu-ray on May 31, 2016.

== Reception ==
=== Box office ===
Triple 9 grossed $12.6 million in North America, and $13.3 million in other territories, for a total gross of $25.9 million, against a production budget of $20 million.

In the United States and Canada, pre-release tracking suggested the film would gross $7–9 million from 2,205 theaters in its opening weekend, trailing fellow newcomer Gods of Egypt ($12–15 million projection) but similar to Eddie the Eagle. The film made $2.1 million on its first day and $6.1 million in its opening weekend, finishing 6th at the box office.

=== Critical response ===
On Rotten Tomatoes, the film holds an approval rating of 54% based on 186 reviews, with an average rating of 5.8/10. The site's consensus reads, "Triple 9's pulpy potboiler thrills don't quite live up to the ferocious talents of its cast, but the film's efficient, solidly crafted genre fun is often enough to balance its troublesome flaws." Metacritic gives the film a weighted average score of 52 out of 100, based on 41 critics, indicating "mixed or average reviews". Audiences surveyed by CinemaScore gave the film an average grade of "C+" on an A+ to F scale.

Tom Huddleston of Time Out gave Triple 9 four out of five stars, positively comparing the film to Michael Mann's Heat. Huddleston praised the ensemble cast and concluded that the film is "carried off with brashness and momentum by a director who genuinely seems to be having a blast." Variety's Justin Chang was less receptive towards the film's narrative, but applauded its action sequences and wrote that the "result is a film that conveys the eerie sense of lying in wait for all its characters, and the paranoia is infectious, with at least two scenes certain to have viewers checking their car backseats upon exiting the theater.

In a mixed review, Empire's Ian Freer gave Triple 9 three out of five stars. Freer praised the cast's performance, but criticized the film's screenplay and second half, surmising that "the interesting world of the film doesn't get the story it deserves." While praising Anthony Mackie's performance and Nicholas Karakatsanis's cinematography, Indiewire's Oliver Lyttelton criticized the film's narrative structure as unsatisfying, suggesting that "perhaps there's a longer cut out there… perhaps that cut led to a film that felt like it was actually about something." Alonso Duralde of TheWrap also panned Triple 9, in particular, disapproving of the film's screenplay and third act. Duralde writes: "…[Triple 9] somehow managed to collect an impressively A-list cast on its way toward becoming a cop movie that's not just dumb, it's disastrous."
