= A Million Little Pieces (film) =

2018 film directed by Sam Taylor-Johnson

- American release poster
- Directed by: Sam Taylor-Johnson
- Screenplay by: Aaron Taylor-Johnson; Sam Taylor-Johnson
- Based on: A Million Little Pieces by James Frey
- Produced by: Aaron Taylor-Johnson; Sam Taylor-Johnson; Brad Weston; Pamela Abdy; Andrew Rona; Alex Heineman
- Starring: Aaron Taylor-Johnson; Billy Bob Thornton; Odessa Young; Giovanni Ribisi; Juliette Lewis; Charlie Hunnam
- Cinematography: Jeff Cronenweth
- Edited by: Martin Pensa
- Music by: Atticus Ross; Leopold Ross; Claudia Sarne
- Production companies: Makeready; Snoopsquirrel; The Picture Company; 3blackdot; Federal Films
- Distributed by: Momentum Pictures (United States); Entertainment One (International)
- Release dates: September 10, 2018 (TIFF); December 6, 2019 (United States)
- Running time: 113 minutes
- Countries: Canada; United States
- Language: English
- Box office: $89,825

A Million Little Pieces is a 2018 psychological drama film directed by Sam Taylor-Johnson, and written by Sam and Aaron Taylor-Johnson. Based on the 2003 semi-fictional book of the same name by James Frey, it follows Frey, a drug-addicted young man, who gets checked into a rehabilitation center to battle his addiction. The film stars Aaron Taylor-Johnson as Frey, and co-stars Billy Bob Thornton, Odessa Young, Giovanni Ribisi, Juliette Lewis, and Charlie Hunnam.

A Million Little Pieces premiered at the 2018 Toronto International Film Festival, and was released in the United States by Momentum Pictures on December 6, 2019, and internationally by Entertainment One. It was poorly received by critics.

== Premise ==
An alcoholic and a drug addict, 23 year-old James has two options: treatment or death. After waking up on a plane with a smashed up face and no memory of the past few weeks, he heads to rehab where he discovers much more than detox and therapy. As James endures the white-knuckle journey of mending his broken body, he heals his broken soul by connecting with other kindred spirits who also yearn and fight for a better life.

— Momentum Pictures

== Cast ==
- Aaron Taylor-Johnson as James Frey
- Billy Bob Thornton as Leonard
- Odessa Young as Lilly
- Giovanni Ribisi as John Everett
- Juliette Lewis as Joanne
- Charlie Hunnam as Bob Frey, Jr.
- David Dastmalchian as Roy
- Charles Parnell as Miles Davis
- Andy Buckley as Dr. Stevens
- Ryan Hurst as Hank
- Dash Mihok as Lincoln
- Eugene Byrd as Matty
- Tom Amandes as Dr. Baker
- Dominic Pace as Cecil
- Drake Andrew as Ed
- Deep Rai as Ticket Officer
- Keith Barber as Old White Man

== Production ==
Bidding rights for A Million Little Pieces began just as the book had been released. Warner Bros. Pictures emerged as the winner of the bidding war, beating out companies like DreamWorks Pictures and The Firm. John Wells would produce the film, along with Brad Pitt through his production company Plan B Entertainment. James Frey would adapt his story for the film. In September 2004, Laurence Dunmore was announced to direct, although Mark Romanek replaced him at some point. After it emerged the book was not a memoir as promoted, and the author James Frey fabricated elements of the story, the film was shelved. Romanek had only been scouting for locations just before the news had come out. Tod Williams had been brought on to write a draft that acknowledged the controversy, but it never came to be.

In October 2017, Sam Taylor-Johnson was announced to be directing the film, with her husband Aaron Taylor-Johnson attached to star. They admitted while the original story wasn't true, they liked the idea of a man's road to redemption. In January 2018, Billy Bob Thornton, Carla Juri, Charlie Hunnam and Giovanni Ribisi were added to the cast, with production beginning on January 25. David Dastmalchian and Juliette Lewis were cast a few days later. Odessa Young and Charles Parnell joined the cast in February, with Young replacing Juri.

== Music ==
Atticus Ross, Leopold Ross and Claudia Sarne composed the film's score. Republic Records released the soundtrack with a score suite from the composers and songs by Otis Redding, Tom Waits, The Velvet Underground, Greta Van Fleet and others.

== Release ==
A Million Little Pieces premiered at the Toronto International Film Festival in 2018. The film was released in select theaters and video-on-demand in the United States by Momentum Pictures on December 6, 2019, and internationally by Entertainment One (who also owns Momentum). Additionally the film was released on DVD in the United States by Universal Pictures Home Entertainment on January 6, 2020. It earned $89,825 at the international box office.

== Reception ==
=== Critical response ===
Rotten Tomatoes gives the film an approval rating of 27%, based on 48 reviews, with an average rating of 5/10. The site's consensus reads, "While solidly cast and competently helmed, A Million Little Pieces amounts to little more than a well-intentioned but unpersuasive echo of a deeply problematic memoir." Metacritic gave the film a score of 45 out of 100 based on the opinions of 14 critics, indicating "mixed or average reviews".
