= Atticus Ross =

English musician and composer (born 1968)

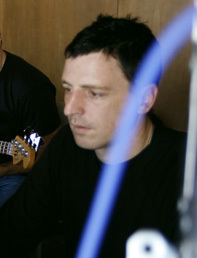
- Ross in 2006
- Born: 16 January 1968 (age 58); London, England
- Occupations: Musician; composer; record producer; audio engineer
- Years active: 1992–present
- Spouse: Claudia Sarne
- Children: 3
- Relatives: Leopold Ross (brother); Liberty Ross (sister); Charles Glass (uncle); Miles Lampson, 1st Baron Killearn (grandfather); Aldo Castellani (great-grandfather); Curtis Lampson (great-great-grandfather)
- Musical career
- Genres: Industrial; alternative rock; dark ambient; experimental; electronica; film score
- Instruments: Keyboards; bass
- Member of: Nine Inch Nails; How to Destroy Angels; 12 Rounds; Nine Inch Noize
- Formerly of: Error

Atticus Matthew Cowper Ross (born 16 January 1968) is an English musician, composer, record producer, and audio engineer. He is best known for his work with American musician Trent Reznor, with whom he first worked on the musical project Tapeworm in 2002. He began working with Reznor's band Nine Inch Nails in 2005 as a programmer and producer, then joined as a musician and became the only official member of the band other than Reznor in 2016.

Outside of Nine Inch Nails, Ross and Reznor have become known for their work on film scores. They won the Academy Award for Best Original Score for The Social Network in 2010, the Grammy Award for Best Score Soundtrack for Visual Media for The Girl with the Dragon Tattoo in 2013, and the Golden Globe and Academy Award for Soul (alongside Jon Batiste) in 2021. In 2025, Ross and Reznor won the Golden Globe again for Challengers.

Ross was inducted into the Rock and Roll Hall of Fame as a member of Nine Inch Nails in 2020. He and Reznor co-created the virtual supergroup WitchGang in 2023.

== Early life ==
Atticus Matthew Cowper Ross was born in the Ladbroke Grove area of London on 16 January 1968, the son of Roxana Rose Catherine Naila and Radio Caroline co-founder Ian Cowper Ross. His maternal grandfather was diplomat Miles Lampson, 1st Baron Killearn (1880–1964), who was the grandson of fur merchant Curtis Lampson (1806–1885). He has five siblings, including fellow musician Leopold Ross and fashion model Liberty Ross. His great-grandfather was Italian pathologist and bacteriologist Aldo Castellani (1874–1971), while his uncle is English-American journalist Charles Glass. Ross was educated at Eton College and later at the Courtauld Institute of Art.

== Career ==
=== Music ===
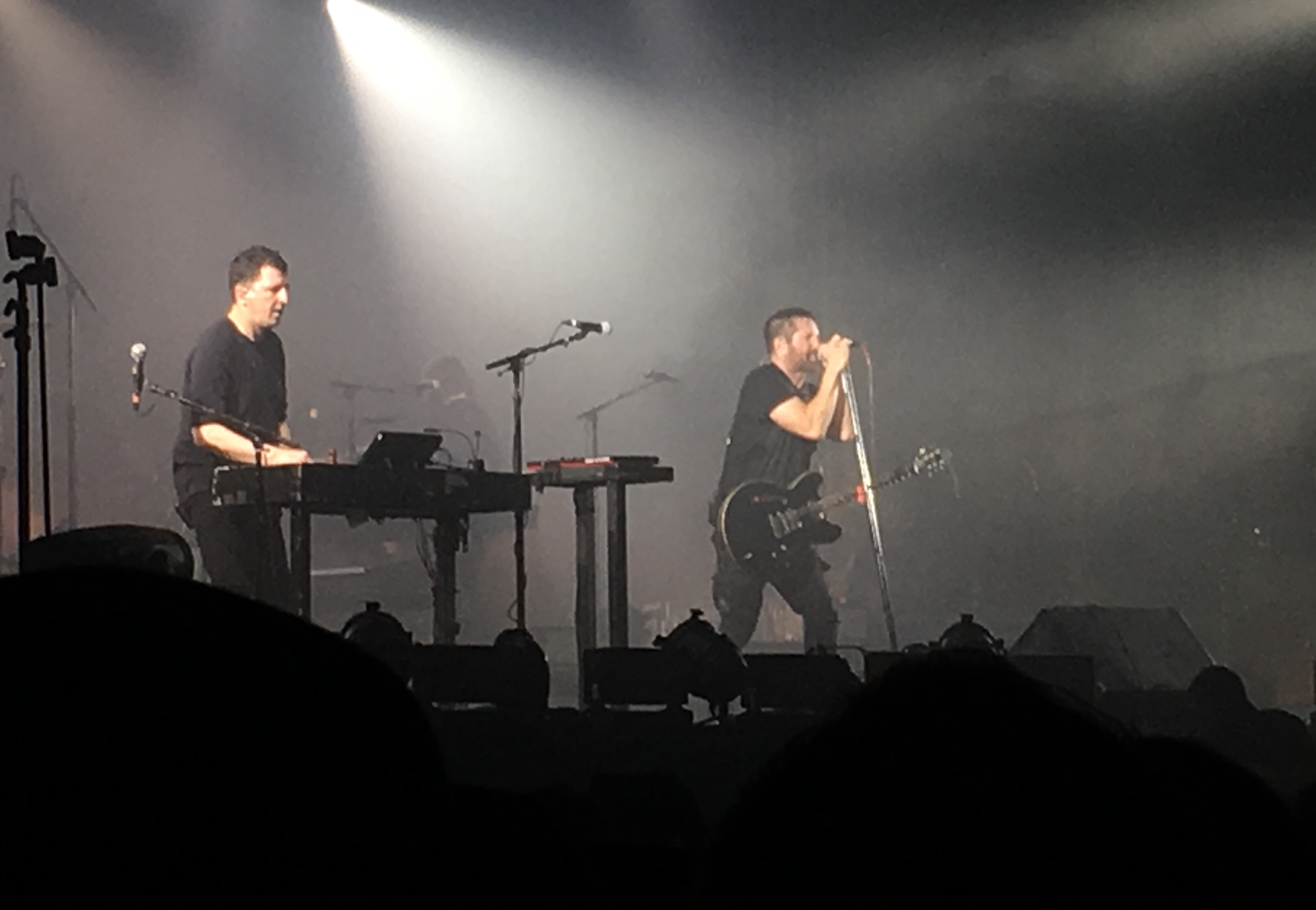
Ross (left) with Nine Inch Nails in 2018

Ross came to notice in the mid-1990s as a synthesizer programmer for Tim Simenon's Bomb the Bass during the period of the albums Unknown Territory and Clear. He worked on a number of production and remix projects with Simenon, as well as forming a collaborative relationship with Barry Adamson. He programmed The Negro Inside Me and Oedipus Schmoedipus, and produced As Above So Below before forming his own band, 12 Rounds, with his wife Claudia Sarne and Adam Holden. They released two albums, Jitterjuice and My Big Hero. A third full-length album was produced by Trent Reznor, but was ultimately never finished. Three songs from that album have since been released on the band's website.

Ross moved to the United States in 2000, and as of 2002 was working alongside Reznor for his side project Tapeworm. He has been credited as a producer and/or programmer on the Nine Inch Nails albums With Teeth, Year Zero, Ghosts I–IV (on which he was a co-writer), The Slip, and Hesitation Marks. He has worked with Reznor in numerous other capacities, including work with Saul Williams and Zack de la Rocha, and they co-produced tracks for a reformed Jane's Addiction with Alan Moulder in 2009.

Other work has included two co-productions with Joe Barresi, the Loverman EP Human Nurture and Coheed and Cambria's Year of the Black Rainbow, as well as albums for Korn. He has also produced tracks or created remixes for such artists as Grace Jones, Perry Farrell, and Telepathe. In May 2010, he appeared in a cryptic video and was named as a member of a secret project, later revealed to be How to Destroy Angels, a collaboration between Reznor and his wife Mariqueen Maandig. In 2016, Ross composed an original score titled 'The Journey' for FIFA 17's new single-player story campaign mode. In 2020, he co-produced and co-wrote one track on Jehnny Beth's To Love Is to Live. In 2021, Ross and Reznor produced and co-wrote Halsey's album If I Can't Have Love, I Want Power.

=== Film and television scores ===
Ross's work in film music began in 2004 when he scored the Hughes Brothers's TV series Touching Evil with his wife Claudia Sarne and brother Leopold Ross. He has since provided music for two further Hughes Brothers projects: Allen Hughes's vignette in the film New York, I Love You, and Ross's first feature film, The Book of Eli (2010). The latter's score was released through Reprise Records on 12 January 2010. It won at the BMI Awards and earned Ross a nomination as "Discovery of the Year" at the 2010 World Soundtrack Awards.

On 1 July 2010, Reznor announced that he and Ross were scoring David Fincher's new film The Social Network. The film's soundtrack was released on 28 September 2010, and was highly praised. On 16 January 2011, they won the Golden Globe Award for Best Original Score for their score to The Social Network. On 27 February, they received the Academy Award for Best Original Score for The Social Network. Ross and Reznor again collaborated on the soundtrack to Fincher's 2011 film Girl With the Dragon Tattoo. In 2013, the pair won the Grammy Award for Best Score Soundtrack for Visual Media for their Girl with the Dragon Tattoo soundtrack.

Ross was slated to work on the 2013 samurai epic 47 Ronin, but was soon replaced by Javier Navarrete. Ross and Reznor again teamed up with Fincher to score his 2014 film Gone Girl. In 2016, Ross and Reznor, along with composer Gustavo Santaolalla and the band Mogwai, collaborated to create the score to the documentary film Before the Flood.

In June 2017, Ross, along with Reznor, Maandig, Robin Finck, Joey Castillo, and Alessandro Cortini, appeared as "The Nine Inch Nails" in Episode 8 of Twin Peaks: The Return on Showtime, performing an alternative live rendition of the song "She's Gone Away" which previously appeared on Nine Inch Nails's 2016 EP Not the Actual Events.

In 2021, Reznor, Ross, and Jon Batiste won the Golden Globe and Academy Award for the soundtrack for Soul. Since then, Ross and Reznor have composed numerous film scores, frequently collaborating with director David Fincher, as well as working with Luca Guadagnino on Challengers, which earned them the Golden Globe for Best Original Score once again.

== Personal life ==
Ross and his wife, musician and composer Claudia Sarne, split their time between London and Los Angeles.

== Works ==
=== Musical scores ===
==== Film ====
Year	Title	Director	Studio(s)	Notes
2008	New York, I Love You	Various	Vivendi Entertainment	Segment #6; Composed with Claudia Sarne and Leopold Ross
2010	The Book of Eli	Hughes brothers	Warner Bros. Pictures; Summit Entertainment	Composed with Claudia Sarne and Leopold Ross
2010	The Social Network	David Fincher	Columbia Pictures	Composed with Trent Reznor and 1st collaboration with Fincher
2011	Days of Grace	Everardo Gout	ARP Sélection	Composed with Nick Cave, Warren Ellis, Leopold Ross, Claudia Sarne & Shigeru Umebayashi
2011	The Girl with the Dragon Tattoo	David Fincher	Columbia Pictures	Composed with Trent Reznor
2013	Broken City	Allen Hughes	20th Century Fox	Composed with Claudia Sarne and Leopold Ross
2014	Love & Mercy	Bill Pohlad	Lionsgate; Roadside Attractions	—N/a
2014	Gone Girl	David Fincher	20th Century Fox	Composed with Trent Reznor
2015	Blackhat	Michael Mann	Universal Pictures	Composed with Harry Gregson-Williams and Leo Ross
2015	Almost Holy	Steve Hoover	Roco Films	Composed with Bobby Krlic and Leopold Ross
2016	Triple 9	John Hillcoat	Open Road Films	Composed with Bobby Krlic, Leopold Ross and Claudia Sarne
2016	Visions of Harmony	Joe Sill	—N/a	Composed with Trent Reznor
2016	Before the Flood	Fisher Stevens	National Geographic	Composed with Gustavo Santaolalla, Trent Reznor, and Mogwai
2016	Patriots Day	Peter Berg	Lionsgate	Composed with Trent Reznor
2017	The Black Ghiandola	Catherine Hardwicke; Theodore Melfi; Sam Raimi	—N/a	Short film Composed with Trent Reznor
2017	Death Note	Adam Wingard	Netflix	Composed with Leopold Ross
2018	Mid90s	Jonah Hill	A24	Composed with Trent Reznor
2018	A Million Little Pieces	Sam Taylor-Johnson	Entertainment One	Composed with Leopold Ross and Claudia Sarne
2018	Corazón	John Hillcoat	Serial Pictures	Composed with Leopold Ross and Claudia Sarne
2018	Bird Box	Susanne Bier	Netflix	Composed with Trent Reznor
2019	Waves	Trey Edward Shults	A24	Composed with Trent Reznor
2019	Earthquake Bird	Wash Westmoreland	Netflix	Composed with Leopold Ross and Claudia Sarne
2020	Soul	Pete Docter	Walt Disney Pictures; Pixar Animation Studios	Composed with Trent Reznor
2020	Mank	David Fincher	Netflix	Composed with Trent Reznor
2022	Bones and All	Luca Guadagnino	Warner Bros. Pictures	Composed with Trent Reznor
2022	Empire of Light	Sam Mendes	Searchlight Pictures	Composed with Trent Reznor
2023	Teenage Mutant Ninja Turtles: Mutant Mayhem	Jeff Rowe	Paramount Pictures; Nickelodeon Movies	Composed with Trent Reznor
2023	The Killer	David Fincher	Netflix	Composed with Trent Reznor
2024	Challengers	Luca Guadagnino	Metro-Goldwyn-Mayer	Co-producer and co-performer for 15 songs on the soundtrack as well; co-composer for 14 songs; co-wrote "Compress / Repress" song
2024	Queer	Luca Guadagnino	A24	Composed with Trent Reznor
2025	The Gorge	Scott Derrickson	Apple Studios	Composed with Trent Reznor
2025	Tron: Ares	Joachim Rønning	Walt Disney Pictures	Composed with Trent Reznor; credited as Nine Inch Nails; also executive producer
2025	After the Hunt	Luca Guadagnino	Amazon MGM Studios	Composed with Trent Reznor
2026	The Further Mis-Adventures of Cliff Booth	David Fincher	Netflix	Composed with Trent Reznor
2027	Slayground	Jeremy Saulnier	A24	Composed with Trent Reznor

==== Television ====
Year	Title	Original channel(s)	Notes
2004	Touching Evil	USA Network	Composed with Leopold Ross and Claudia Sarne
2015	Fear the Walking Dead	AMC	
2016–2017	Outcast	Cinemax	Composed with Leopold Ross and Claudia Sarne
2017	The Defiant Ones	HBO	Composed with Leopold Ross and Claudia Sarne
2017	The Vietnam War	PBS	Composed with Trent Reznor
2017	Black Mirror	Netflix	"Crocodile" (season 4, episode 3); Composed with Leopold Ross and Claudia Sarne
2019	Watchmen	HBO	Composed with Trent Reznor
2020	Dispatches from Elsewhere	AMC	Composed with Leopold Ross and Claudia Sarne
2021	Dr. Death	Peacock	Composed with Leopold Ross and Nick Chuba
2024	Shōgun	Hulu and FX	Composed with Leopold Ross and Nick Chuba

==== Video games ====
Year	Title	Studio(s)	Notes
2016	FIFA 17	EA Sports	—N/a
TBA	Intergalactic: The Heretic Prophet	Naughty Dog	With Trent Reznor

=== Nine Inch Nails ===
- With Teeth (2005) (Production and programming)
- Year Zero (2007) (Production and programming)
- Ghosts I–IV (2008) (Songwriter, production and programming)
- The Slip (2008) (Production and programming)
- Hesitation Marks (2013) (Production, programming, arranging and engineering)
- Not the Actual Events (2016) (Production, performer and songwriter)
- The Fragile: Deviations 1 (2016) (Production)
- Add Violence (2017) (Production, performer and songwriter)
- Bad Witch (2018) (Production, performer and songwriter)

=== Production ===
- No Jahoda – Jahoda Witness
- Korn – See You on the Other Side (also co-writing)
- Korn – Untitled
- Coheed and Cambria – Year of The Black Rainbow (with Joe Barresi)
- Perry Farrell – "Go All the Way (Into the Twilight)"
- Loverman – Human Nurture (with Joe Barresi)
- Lil Nas X – "Old Town Road" (also co-writing)
- Jehnny Beth – To Love Is to Live (also co-writing)
- Halsey – If I Can't Have Love, I Want Power (with Trent Reznor)
- WitchGang (with David Sitek, Hudson Mohawke, and Trent Reznor, also co-writing)

=== Programming ===
- Bad Religion – Beyond Electric Dreams
- Barry Adamson – Oedipus Schmoedipus, The Negro Inside Me
- From First To Last – The Levy
- P!nk – Try This
- Saul Williams – The Inevitable Rise and Liberation of NiggyTardust! (2007)
- Bomb the Bass – Clear
