= Naoki Kobayashi =

Japanese actor, dancer, choreographer and model

Naoki Kobayashi 小林 直己
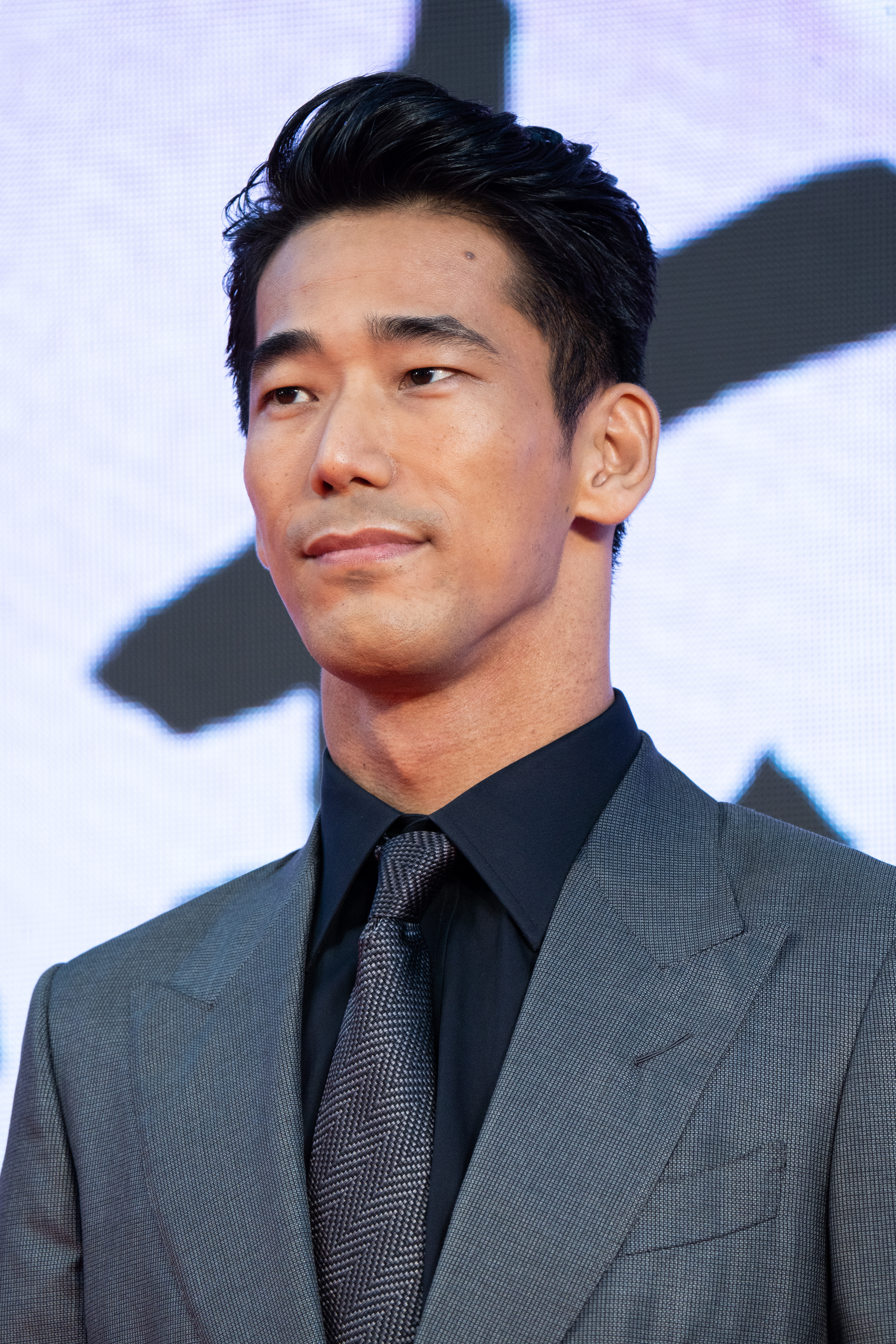
- Naoki at the opening ceremony of the Tokyo International Film Festival 2019

Background information
- Also known as: Naoki (stylized as NAOKI); Jr Twiggz
- Born: 10 November 1984 (age 41); Chiba Prefecture, Japan
- Genres: J-pop
- Occupations: Actor; dancer; model
- Years active: 2010–present
- Label: Rhythm Zone
- Website: Official website
- agent: LDH Japan

Naoki Kobayashi (小林 直己, Kobayashi Naoki; born 10 November 1984, in Inzai, Chiba Prefecture) is a Japanese actor, dancer, choreographer, and model. He is a performer of J-Pop dance and vocal group Exile, and is a leader and performer of J-Pop dance and vocal group Sandaime J Soul Brothers. He was also a member of Nidaime J Soul Brothers until their migration to Exile in 2009. As a member of Sandaime J Soul Brothers, he has received the Japan Record Awards twice, and has received the same award three times as a member of Exile. He choreographed the famous "Pocky Dance" (Pocky Sharehappi Dance) for Pocky's advertisement in 2015.

Besides, he has also taken up acting and made his international debut in Netflix's original film Earthquake Bird. He has also worked as a model for the fashion brand "Yohji Yamamoto". With his fluent-spoken English and understanding of American culture, he serves as a creative career advisor in the Executive Management Team of LDH USA. He has a strong interest in traditional Japanese culture, which has motivated him to take part in a few projects focusing on promoting the art of samurai and Japanese swords.

== Early life ==
Naoki Kobayashi was born on 10 November 1984, in Inzai, Chiba Prefecture, Japan. His deep love for music started in junior high school, when he was a teenager troubled by existential anxiety and sleeping disorder. While questioning his role in this world, he found relief in music such as J-pop as he learned from the lyrics that there are various ways of life. During his high school days, he wanted to become a singer-songwriter and even considered quitting school to pursue a career in music. He stopped attending school for half a year and considered to continue his education at a music school. However, his mother persuaded him to go back to high school, suggesting that a singer-songwriter must understand the thoughts and feelings of a normal high school student. Back being a student, he joined the school's chorus and started to take vocal training lessons.

Naoki started dancing at the age of 17, with the consideration that a musician needs to have a good sense of rhythm. After graduating from high school, he was enrolled in the Department of Philosophy of Hosei University with relatively good grades, but he quit university as he became determined to focus on dancing. He started to try out all kinds of genres and went to Avex Artist Academy for training. In 2005, Naoki met his future groupmate, the then famous underground dancer Naoto, for the first time.

== Career ==
=== 2006–2010：From Rag Pound to Nidaime J Soul Brothers ===
In May 2006, Naoki participated in the dance battle Dance Alive 2006, which was held in celebration of the Japanese release of RIZE, an American documentary film about Clowning and Krumping. During the tournament, he met Krump dance team Rag Pound. Their member Akira noticed Naoki and invited him to join Rag Pound after the battle. Naoki accepted the offer and joined the team in July of the same year while also starting to use the alias Jr.Twiggz as a member.

Since Akira was invited to join Exile in June 2006, Rag Pound's member naturally grew closer to Exile's management company, LDH. Naoki was also very impressed and inspired by the Exile Vocal Battle Audition 2006 ~ Asian Dream~ and became even more interested in the entertainment produced by Exile. In October 2006, he took part in LDH's audition for the dance and vocal group Nidaime J Soul Brothers("The Second Generation of J Soul Brothers") but failed. Shortly afterwards in December 2006, he enrolled in EXPG Studio Tokyo, the talent school run by LDH, and became an instructor at EXPG in March 2007.

In 2007, Naoki was invited to join Nidaime J Soul Brothers as a performer alongside Naoto, after the group's producer Hiro decided that they should be a seven-member group. Naoki started using NAOKI as his stage name and performed as a member of Nidaime J Soul Brothers for the first time at COLOR LIVE TOUR 2007 BLUE on 10 November 2007. Meanwhile, in September 2007, Naoki debut as an actor in Gekidan Exile's first play Burnt by the Sun while also choreographing for the play.

On 7 May 2008, Nidaime J Soul Brothers released their first single "WE!", which was sold exclusively on Exile's mobile website. Meanwhile, Naoki performed in Gekidan Exile's 2nd show CROWN ~Nemuranai, Yoru no Hate ni…~ in May. From October to November, the group went on a nation-wide small-scale tour, the so-called Musha Shugyo ("Samurai Training"), during which the members traveled on a bus and put on 48 shows in 2 months around the country. From 29 November to December, Naoki also took part in Exile Live Tour Exile Perfect Live 2008 with his group.

On 25 February 2009, Nidaime J Soul Brothers released their first album J Soul Brothers, which landed on the first place of Oricon Albums Chart on the first day of its release. At the same time, Naoki made his major debut in the music industry.

=== 2009–present: Exile and Sandaime J Soul Brothers ===
On 1 March 2009, as all members of Nidaime J Soul Brothers migrated to Exile, Naoki joined Exile.

In July 2010, LDH announced that they wanted to revive J Soul Brothers and formed Sandaime J Soul Brothers ("The Third Generation of J Soul Brothers"). Hiro, the producer of the new J Soul Brothers, appointed Naoki and Naoto, the two youngest members of Exile, as the co-leaders of the new dance and vocal group. While remaining as performers of Exile, Naoki and Naoto also started to serve as performers of the Sandaime J Soul Brothers. As the leader of the new Sandaime J Soul Brothers, Naoki actively participated in the selection of the group's members, recommending then-EXPG's instructor Kenjiro Yamashita and Rag Pound's member Takanori Iwata, a university student at that time, to join the audition. On 27 September, Naoki appeared and performed first time as a member of Sandaime J Soul Brothers on the stage of Exile's Live FANTASY After Night Festival ～EXILE Soul～. On 10 November, the birthday of Naoki, Sandaime J Soul Brothers debuted with their first single "Best Friend's Girl".

In February and March 2013, Naoki performed in Shunichi Okamura's play Atami Satsujin Jiken 40years' NEW and played the character Kintaro Oyama.

With 2014 becoming an important year for both Sandaime J Soul Brothers, it was also marked as an important year for Naoki. As EXILE's Chapter 4 kicked off in 2014, Naoki switched from his stage name NAOKI to his real name Naoki Kobayashi (stylized as 小林直己). On 25 June, Sandaime J Soul Brothers' major hit R.Y.U.S.E.I. was released. The song topped the Oricon Single Charts at number one selling 162,174 copies on its first week. The song also won Naoki and Sandaime J Soul Brothers the Japan Record Award for the first time and skyrocketed the group to mainstream success. In December 2014, Naoki debuted on television with the drama Ishi Mondai Nashinosuke.

On 28 January 2015, Naoki and Sandaime J Soul Brothers released their fifth album, Planet Seven, which sold 508 thousand copies in the first week after its release. In 2015, Krump dance tram Rag Pound revived as ®AG POUND, and Naoki joined the new team together with other former Rag Pound members like Akira and Takanori Iwata. In February 2015, he played the role of a criminal in TV Asahi's Kuroha ~Kisou no Josei Sousakan~. On 15 October, Naoki teamed up with Sandaime J Soul Brothers' vocalist Hiroomi Tosaka and performer Takanori Iwata to form Sandaime's special sub-unit The Sharehappi from Sandaime J Soul Brothers from Exile Tribe, and released their one and only single, Share The Love, which is a theme song used in the advertisement for Pocky. He choreographed the famous Pocky Dance(Pocky Sharehappi Dance) for the song and the Pocky's advertisement, which became quite a national hit as people around the country continual to imitate the dance move.

On 22 July 2016, Naoki took part in live tour High&Low The Live of the High&Low franchise, the action, and music franchise produced by the Exile Tribe(LDH). From April, he played himself in the TV Drama Night Hero Naoto, which is a story with an imaginary setting added to the existing Naoto, and Naoki appeared in the story as a good friend to his fellow Exile and Sandaime J Soul Brothers groupmate Naoto. (This is what he actually is to Naoto in the real-life). In June 2016, Naoki appeared on the runway of the fashion brand "Yohji Yamamoto" for Yohji Yamamoto HOMME 2017 SS Paris Collection in Paris, France. From November 2016, Naoki took part in Sandaime J Soul Brothers’ second dome tour Sandaime J Soul Brothers Live Tour 2016–2017 'Metropoliz'.

In January 2017, Naoki appeared at Yohji Yamamoto HOMME 2017–2018 AW Paris Collection as a show model for a second time. Naoki has also served as a show model for Y-3 2017–2018 AW Paris Collection in the same year. As LDH announced its ambition of evolving into a Global Entertainment and Creative Production Team, LDH WORLD in this year，LDH set up its branch in America, LDH USA. Naoki joined LDH USA's management team as creative career advisor, aiming to bring Japanese Culture to Hollywood. From September, he took part in Sandaime J Soul Brothers' third dome tour Sandaime J Soul Brothers Live Tour 2017 'Unknown Metropoliz'， and performed in 10 continual days in Tokyo Dome.

In 2017, Naoki also began to focus more on his acting career. As early as 2015, with his vision to bring Japanese culture to the world, and his wish to become the member that focus more on oversea of his groups, Naoki decided that films would be his next move, and set up his goal of building an international base acting career. Therefore, Naoki started to take acting lessons and English courses in the same year. But it was in 2017 that he finally debut on the big screen in the film Tatara Samurai, a film that competed in the World Competition Section of the 40th Montreal World Film Festival and won the award for the Best Artistic Contribution. Naoki played Shinpei, a friend from childhood to Gosuke, the main character, and he stated that his experience in dancing has helped him to perform Japanese sword fighting scene since this two are not so far away. He won the Best Supporting Actor Award at the Auckland International Film Festival (New Zealand). On 19 August, the third film of the High&Low franchise, High&Low The Movie 2 / End of Sky, was released, and Naoki played Genji Kuki, a samurai-like killer, and leader of Kuki gang of Kuryu Group. He revived his role in High&Low The Movie 3 / Final Mission, which was released on 11 November.

With pure love for entertainment and having seen its possibility as Exile's and Sandaime J Soul Brothers' member, Naoki continues to broaden his horizon and involves himself in the planning and production of projects that expand the possibilities of dance performances. In 2017, Naoki produced a music video, "Here I Stand -Dance Ver."- by R&B singer Jay'ed, as director for the first time. He choreographed the dance move for the song, and dance alongside Harumi Sato in the music video. The music video was released on YouTube on 11 August. He also produced and performed in the Sword Cutting(辻斬り) musical for the drama × entertainment show "Uzumasa Edo Sakaba" in the same year, which was shown at Kyoto Studio Park and contained scenes of the Samurai Sword Dance Performance, which is a collaboration of sword performance and dance performance.

In 2018, Naoki appeared again on the runway of Yohji Yamamoto HOMME 2018–2019 AW Paris Collection.

After Naoki's fateful meeting with Ridley Scott, Netflix announced in 2018 that Naoki would fill out the lethal love triangle with Alicia Vikander and Riley Keough of Earthquake Bird, a film executive-produced by Ridley Scott. The film marked his first foray into American cinema, and Naoki starred as Teiji, a Tokyo photographer who drove a wedge between his female co-stars. The film was screened on BFI London Film Festival on 10 October 2019, and started streaming on Netflix on 15 November 2019.

On 13 April 2019, Sandaime J Soul Brothers' new dome tour Sandaime J Soul Brothers Live Tour 2019 'Raise the Flag' began, and Naoki took part in this tour as Sandaime J Soul Brothers' performer. In May 2019, Naoki was invited to the 2019 Met Gala. In June 2019, LDH announced that Naoki Kobayashi would start in short film Umikaze of the drama anthology Sono Shunkan, Boku wa Nakitaku Natta -Cinema Fighters project-, which is the 3rd film of the Cinema Fighters project, a joint project by Exile Hiro, Tetsuya Bessho, who is the representative director of SSFF & ASIA, and lyricist Masato Odake. The film hit the big screen on 8 November 2019. In April, Naoki, together with RAG POUND's member Akira, Takanori Iwata, Reo Sano, Mandy Sekiguchi, appeared in NTT Docomo's new advertisement of its Hoshi Pro advertisement series. In August, Universal Studio Japan appointed Sandaime J Soul Brothers' performers Kenjiro Yamashita and Naoto as its ambassadors for its Halloween event of 2019, Universal Surprise Halloween, and announced that the theme of 2019's Halloween event would be Zombie de Dance. Naoki choreographed the Zombie de Dance for Sandaime J Soul Brothers' new song "Rat-tat-tat", while both the song and the Zombie de Dance were used in USJ's advertisement and its Hollywood events. He also produced a music video for Samurai Sword Dance Performance in the same year, which was performed by Naoki himself and students from EXPG Studio Kyoto. The music video was released on YouTube, and students from EXPG Studio Kyoto also put on Samurai Sword Dance Performance's shows in Kyoto.

From 23 October, Naoki's first autobiographical essay "I can't become EXILE" was serialized on Bungei Shunjū digital. On 10 November 2020, his 36th birthday, he opened his own YouTube channel "Naoki's Dream Village".

== Other work ==
In June 2015, Naoki, Akira and Sho Aoyagi were appointed as the image characters of Shimane Prefecture's promotional video, Goen no Kuni Shimane.

Naoki actively took part in LDH's Yume no Kagai Jugyō Chūgakusei Rising Sun Project Project (Your dream Extracurricular Class: Rising Sun Project for junior high school student), a charity project aiming to encourage children throughout Japan, especially those in Tohoku and Kumamoto, to become energetic with the power of dance after 2011 Tōhoku earthquake and tsunami and 2016 Kumamoto earthquakes, and supported the reconstruction work in post-earthquake Tōhoku and Kumamoto. Naoki, took part in a few special lessons in some post-earthquake area, teaching dance move of Rising Sun, the song in support of the recovery after the 2011 Tōhoku earthquake and tsunami, to children of those post-earthquake areas to cheer them up.

== Personal life ==
=== Family ===
Naoki has an older brother, and he calls his mother "funky" as she loves to sing and dance. Her love for music and dance has influenced Naoki to join the world of entertainment.

=== Health ===
On 25 January 2012, LDH announced that Naoki has been diagnosed with spinal canal stenosis, and he would limit his activity to undergo surgery and recovery. He returned to public eyes in April of the same year in Exile Tribe Live Tour 2012～Tower of Wish～.

=== Hobby ===
Naoki has a strong interest in traditional Japanese culture, especially the culture of the Japanese sword. He learned sword fighting from Ryōtarō Sugi in Ryōtarō Sugi's school for Acting before he joined his teacher in the TV drama Ishi Mondai Nashinosuke. He has been practicing sword fighting since then, and he took part in a few projects focusing on promoting the culture of Japanese Samurai and Japanese sword, including the Sword Cutting(辻斬り) musical he produced for drama × entertainment show Uzumasa Edo Sakaba in the same year in 2017, and his collaboration with EXPG Kyoto, The Samurai Sword Dance Performance.

Although he dropped out of the Department of Philosophy of Hosei University, he continued his interest in philosophy and loved to read Socrates and Hippocrates in his spare time.

Naoki is able to play the guitar and he gave a guitar performance in Sandaime J Soul Brothers Live Tout 2012 '0～Zero～'.

== Participating groups ==
Name	Period of time
Rag Pound	2006
Nidaime J Soul Brothers	10 November 2007 – 1 March 2009
Exile	1 March 2009 –
Sandaime J Soul Brothers	10 November 2010 –
Dance Earth Party	2014 –
®AG POUND	2015 –
The Sharehappi from Sandaime J Soul Brothers from Exile Tribe	2015 –

== Filmography ==
※His roles in bold are shown as his starring works

=== Stage ===
Year	Title	Role
2007	GEKIDAN EXILE's 1st show "Taiyou ni Yakarete"	
2008	GEKIDAN EXILE's 2nd show "CROWN ~Nemuranai, Yoru no Hate ni…~	
2009	Atakku No. 1	Lieutenant Ichiro Kitago
2009	Sono Tettō ni Otoko-tachi wa iru to iu	**Yoshimura**
2010	GEKIDAN EXILE JUNCTION No. 1 "NIGHT BALLET"	**Oga** / **Miyake**
2010	GEKIDAN EXILE's 4th show "DANCE EARTH ~Negai~"	Yoshiki
2013	Atami Satsujin Jiken 40 years' New	Kintaro Oyama
2013	Hiryū-den 21: Satsuriku no Aki	
2013	Attack No.1"	
2014	DANCE EARTH PROJECT Global Entertainment "Changes"	Kokutan

=== TV dramas ===
Year	Title	Role	Network	Notes	Ref.
2015	Kuroha: Kisō no Josei Sōsa-kan	Raiun	TV Asahi		
2016	Night Hero Naoto	Naoki Kobayashi	TV Tokyo	Episode 1, 4, 10,11;Ending dance	
2017	Shichijitsugōken 〜 ikizama 〜	Shikasuke Yamanaka	mable		

=== Short film ===
Year	Title	Role	Ref.
2019	Cinema Fighters Project "Umikaze"	Ren	
2019	Koya no Shinobu Return of Ninja (荒野の忍 Return of Ninja)		

=== Internet dramas ===
Year	Title	Role	Website	Ref.
2014	Ishi Mondai Nainosuke	Ittosai Yamino	d Video powered by Bee TV	
2016	Ishi Mondai Nainosuke 2	Ittosai Yamino	d Video powered by Bee TV	

=== Films ===
Year	Title	Role
2017	Tatara Samurai	**Shinpei**
2017	High&Low The Movie 2 / End of Sky	Genji Kuki
2017	High&Low The Movie 3 / Final Mission	Genji Kuki
2019	Earthquake Bird	**Teiji**

=== Advertisements ===
Year	Title	Ref.
2012	GREE "Seisen Cerberus"	
2012	Fujitsu Arrows	
2015-2017	Ezaki Glico Pocky	
2017	Yōfuku no Aoyama "Aoyama Prestige Technology"	
2018	Nissin (Cup Noodle)	
2019	NTT Docomo × ®AG POUND	

=== Internet programmes ===
Year	Title	Website	Notes	Ref.
2015	19 -Road to Amazing World - Album Hatsubai Rokuban –Naoki no Heya–	Niconico Live	MC	

=== Music video ===
Year	Title	Artist	Notes	Ref.
2016	Smiling Tomorrow		"Know, hepatitis project" theme song	
2016	YEAH!! YEAH!! YEAH!!	EXILE THE SECOND		
2017	Here I Stand -Dance Ver.-	JAY' ED		

== Runways ==
Year	Title	Ref.
2016	Yohji Yamamoto Homme 2017 SS Paris Collection	
2017	Yohji Yamamoto Homme 2017–18 AW Paris Collection	
2017	Y-3 2017–2018 AW Paris Collection	
2018	Yohji Yamamoto HOMME 2018–2019 AW Paris Collection	
2019	GQ Japan "The“O.SHIRO” Collection"	

== Works ==
=== Produce ===
Year	Title	Type	Notes	Ref.
2017	Here I Stand -Dance Ver.-	Music Video	singer JAY' ED	
2017	Sword Cutting(辻斬り)	Musical	for the drama × entertainment show "Uzumasa Edo Sakaba"	
2019	Samurai Sword Dance Performance	Music Video	Sandaime J Soul Brothers' Storm Riders feat.SLASH	

=== Choreography ===
Year	Title	Artist	Ref.
2015	Share the Love	The Sharehappi from Sandaime J Soul Brothers from Exile Tribe	
2019	Rat-tat-tat	Sandaime J Soul Brothers from Exile Tribe	

== Other works ==
Year	Title	Notes	Ref.
2015	Shimane Prefecture Tourism Promotion "Goen no Kuni Shimane"	Image character	
