= Ministry of Love (album) =

Studio album by Io Echo
- Released: April 2, 2013
- Genre: Pop, Rock
- Length: 55:13
- Label: Iamsound Records

Io Echo chronology
Io Echo (2012)	Ministry of Love (2013)

Professional ratings
Aggregate scores
Source	Rating
Metacritic	74/100
Review scores
Source	Rating
Allmusic	3.5/5 stars

Ministry of Love is the debut studio album by American indie rock band Io Echo. It was released in April 2013 under Iamsound Records.

== Track listing ==
No.	Title	Length
1.	"Shanghai Girls"	4:22
2.	"When the Lillies Die"	3:37
3.	"Ministry of Love"	4:05
4.	"Stalemate"	4:37
5.	"Outsiders"	3:59
6.	"Tienanmen Square"	3:22
7.	"Ecstasy Ghost"	3:02
8.	"Drag Love"	3:08
9.	"Addicted"	3:37
10.	"Berlin, It's All a Mess"	3:33
11.	"Forget Me Not"	3:24
12.	"Eye Father"	14:27
