= 12 Rounds (band) =

British rock band

- Origin: London, England
- Genre: Trip hop
- Labels: Polydor, Nothing, Interscope
- Members: Atticus Ross; Claudia Sarne; Leopold Ross
- Past members: Adam Holden; Andy Crisp
- Website: http://www.12rounds.net/

12 Rounds is a British rock band formed by Atticus Ross and singer Claudia Sarne, who are married. After the release of their first album, Jitter Juice, they toured with the Sneaker Pimps. 12 Rounds played the Reading Festival in 1996. Their song "Something's Burning" was featured on the soundtrack to the 1997 film All Over Me, and "Just Another Day," their collaboration with Pale 3, was featured on the soundtrack to the 2000 film The Princess and the Warrior. The group released a few projects under various record labels before releasing My Big Hero under Trent Reznor's Nothing Records. They toured with VAST in August and September 1998 then were the opening act on Marilyn Manson's Mechanical Animals promo tour that ranged from September to December 1998. A follow-up album was recorded with Reznor as producer; it remains unreleased. Ross has nonetheless worked with Reznor on every Nine Inch Nails album since With Teeth as well as other projects.

12 Rounds re-obtained rights to songs from the unreleased third album and plan on releasing singles on their official website. The first song released was titled "Shine On."

== Discography ==
=== Albums ===
- 1996: Jitter Juice (Polydor)
- 1998: My Big Hero (Nothing/Interscope)

=== EPs ===
- 1996: Personally (Polydor)
