= The Book of Eli =

2010 film by the Hughes Brothers

- Theatrical release poster
- Directed by: The Hughes Brothers
- Written by: Gary Whitta
- Produced by: Joel Silver; Denzel Washington; Broderick Johnson; Andrew A. Kosove; David Valdes
- Starring: Denzel Washington; Gary Oldman; Mila Kunis; Ray Stevenson; Jennifer Beals; Frances de la Tour; Michael Gambon
- Cinematography: Don Burgess
- Edited by: Cindy Mollo
- Music by: Atticus Ross; Leopold Ross; Claudia Sarne
- Production companies: Alcon Entertainment; Silver Pictures
- Distributed by: Warner Bros. Pictures (United States, Canada and Turkey); Summit Entertainment (International)
- Release date: January 15, 2010
- Running time: 118 minutes
- Country: United States
- Language: English
- Budget: $80 million
- Box office: $157.1 million

The Book of Eli is a 2010 American post-apocalyptic neo-Western action film directed by the Hughes brothers, written by Gary Whitta, and starring Denzel Washington, Gary Oldman, Mila Kunis, Ray Stevenson, and Jennifer Beals. The story revolves around Eli (Washington), a nomad in a post-apocalyptic world who seeks to deliver his copy of a mysterious book to a safe location on the West Coast of the United States. Filming began in February 2009 and took place in New Mexico.

The Book of Eli was released theatrically in the United States on January 15, 2010, by Warner Bros. Pictures. It received mixed reviews from critics but earned $157.1 million at the worldwide box office on a budget of $80 million.

== Plot ==
Thirty years after a nuclear holocaust, Eli travels on foot across the wasteland of the continental land of the former U.S. nation in search of water. He arrives in a ramshackle town ruled by a warlord named Carnegie, who seeks to control the people through the power of a certain book, which his henchmen have been unable to find.

Eli barters with a store owner, the Engineer, to recharge the battery of his portable music player. At the town bar, he is attacked by a gang of bikers, but swiftly kills them all, demonstrating uncanny survival and fighting skills. Impressed, Carnegie invites Eli to join his employ, but Eli declines. Realizing Eli is a literate man like himself, Carnegie forces him to stay the night under guard. Carnegie's blind mistress, Claudia, brings Eli food and water, and Carnegie orders her daughter Solara to seduce Eli, but he rebuffs her. Solara sees Eli has a book, and he offers to share his food, saying grace before they eat. In the morning, Carnegie overhears Solara repeating the prayer to her mother and realizes Eli has the book he has been seeking — a Bible.

Eli sneaks away, but Carnegie and his henchmen confront him in the street. When Eli refuses to give up the book, Carnegie orders him killed; the ensuing battle leaves Eli untouched, but many henchmen are dead, and Carnegie is shot in the leg. Solara catches up to Eli and leads him to the town's water supply, hoping to accompany him, but he traps her inside and continues alone. Solara escapes and is ambushed by two bandits who attempt to rape her, but Eli reappears and kills them. Continuing west, Eli explains his mission: He has the last remaining copy of the Bible since all other copies were intentionally destroyed following the nuclear war. He says that he was led to the book by a voice in his head, directing him to travel westward to a safe place and assuring him that he would be protected and guided on his journey.

At an isolated house, Eli and Solara fall into a trap, but manage to allay the suspicions of the elderly residents, George and Martha. Realizing that George and Martha are cannibals, Eli and Solara attempt to leave, just as Carnegie and his men arrive. In the ensuing shootout, George and Martha are killed, and Eli and Solara are captured. Threatening to kill Solara, Carnegie forces Eli to surrender the Bible before shooting him and leaving him for dead, departing with his caravan. Solara escapes, destroying one truck with a hand grenade and driving back in another to find Eli. With his remaining vehicle low on fuel, Carnegie returns to town.

Solara finds Eli, and they drive until they reach the Golden Gate Bridge. They row to Alcatraz Island, where they find a group intent on preserving what remains of literature and music. Eli tells the guards that he has a copy of the Bible. Taken inside, Eli dictates the New King James Version of the Bible from memory to Lombardi, the sanctuary's leader.

In the town, Carnegie discovers Eli's bible is in Braille, revealing Eli to be blind. Claudia, feigning ignorance of Braille, tells Carnegie that his leg wound has become infected and the loss of his enforcers has led the people to run amok. At the sanctuary, Eli dies, but not before reciting the entire book. A printing press begins producing copies of the Bible, and Lombardi places one on a bookshelf between the Hebrew Bible and the Quran. Offered sanctuary in Alcatraz, Solara chooses to return home instead. She takes up Eli's machete and other possessions, presumably wanting to kill Carnegie.

== Cast ==
- Denzel Washington as Eli
- Gary Oldman as Bill Carnegie
- Mila Kunis as Solara
- Ray Stevenson as Redridge
- Jennifer Beals as Claudia
- Evan Jones as Martz
- Joe Pingue as Hoyt
- Frances de la Tour as Martha
- Michael Gambon as George
- Tom Waits as Engineer
- Chris Browning as Hijack Leader
- Malcolm McDowell as Lombardi (uncredited)

== Production ==
In May 2007, Warner Bros. Pictures signed the Hughes brothers to direct The Book of Eli, based on a script by Gary Whitta. Subsequently, Anthony Peckham rewrote the script, and in September 2008 Denzel Washington signed on for the role of Eli. The following October, Gary Oldman was cast to star alongside Washington. Principal photography began in February 2009 and took place in New Mexico. Alcon Entertainment financed the film and co-produced with Silver Pictures.

Jeff Imada choreographed the complex fight scenes, which feature the Filipino martial art of arnis. Washington trained for months with Dan Inosanto and Imada for his role.

== Release ==
The Book of Eli was released in theaters on January 15, 2010, by Warner Bros. Pictures in the United States; international sales were handled by Summit Entertainment, with Sony Pictures Releasing International distributing in a large number of international territories.

The film was released on home media (DVD and Blu-ray Disc) in the United States on June 15, 2010, by Warner Home Video.

== Reception ==
=== Box office ===
The film was released in North America on January 15, 2010, in 3,111 theaters. It took in $11,672,970 on its opening day, averaging $3,752 per theater. By the end of its opening four-day holiday weekend, it had grossed $38,437,553, averaging $12,355 per theater. It ranked number two, behind Avatar. On its second weekend, it placed third, being surpassed by Legion, and grossed $15,732,493, averaging $5,057 per theater. On its third weekend, it dropped down to number five, and made $8,908,286, averaging $2,897 per theater.

The film grossed $94,835,059 in the United States and Canada, and $62,256,659 in other markets, with an estimated worldwide total of $157,091,718, over an estimated budget of $80 million.

=== Critical reception ===
Review aggregator Rotten Tomatoes reports that 46% of 207 critics have given the film a positive review, with an average rating of 5.50/10. The site's consensus is that "It's certainly uneven, and many viewers will find that its reach exceeds its grasp, but The Book of Eli finds the Hughes brothers injecting some fresh stylish fun into the kind of post-apocalyptic wasteland filmgoers have seen more than enough of lately." Based on 33 critic reviews, Metacritic (another review aggregator) has assigned the film a weighted average score of 53 out of 100, indicating "mixed or average reviews". Audiences polled by CinemaScore gave the film an average grade of "B+" on an A+ to F scale.

Todd McCarthy of Variety predicted "this will not be one of ... Denzel Washington's bigger grossers". Chicago Sun-Times critic Roger Ebert gave the film three out of four stars, stating: "You won't be sorry you went. It grips your attention, and then at the end throws in several WTF! moments, which are a bonus."

Reviewing the film for The A.V. Club, Scott Tobias graded the film a B and wrote, "At a time when theaters are experiencing a glut of doomsday scenarios, the Hughes' ashen, bombed-out future world looks a little too familiar, no matter how crisply they present it. But the showdown between Washington and a deliciously hammy Oldman complicates the film's overt religiosity".

Owen Gleiberman of Entertainment Weekly gave the film a D, calling it "a ponderous dystopian bummer that might be described as The Road Warrior [Mad Max 2] without car chases, or The Road without humanity.

== Home media ==
The film was released on DVD and Blu-ray Disc on May 31, 2010, in the UK and on June 15, 2010, in the United States and Canada. The DVD took the top spot on all three national home video market charts in its first week. It premiered at No. 1 on Home Media Magazine's Rental Chart, the Nielsen VideoScan Blu-ray chart, and the Nielsen VideoScan First Alert Sales Chart, where it outdistanced its nearest competitor in sales by a 3 to 1 margin.

== Television series ==
In January 2024, it was announced that a prequel television series was in development. Created and written by Whitta, who was to serve as an executive producer, the series would be set decades before the film, and once again center around the titular character. John Boyega was to star in the lead role, and he and the Hughes brothers would be executive producers also. Alcon Television Entertainment was shopping the series to various networks.

== See also ==
- List of black films of the 2010s
