= Broken City =

2013 film by Allen Hughes

- Theatrical release poster
- Directed by: Allen Hughes
- Written by: Brian Tucker
- Produced by: Randall Emmett; Mark Wahlberg; Stephen Levinson; Arnon Milchan; Teddy Schwarzman; Allen Hughes; Remington Chase; Brandt Andersen
- Starring: Mark Wahlberg; Russell Crowe; Catherine Zeta-Jones; Barry Pepper; Kyle Chandler; Natalie Martinez; Jeffrey Wright
- Cinematography: Ben Seresin
- Edited by: Cindy Mollo
- Music by: Atticus Ross; Claudia Sarne; Leopold Ross
- Production companies: Regency Enterprises; Emmett/Furla Films; Inferno Distribution; Black Bear Pictures; New Regency; Closest to the Hole Productions; Leverage Entertainment; Allen Hughes Productions; 1984 Private Defense Contractors; Envision Entertainment
- Distributed by: 20th Century Fox (North America and Italy); Inferno Distribution (International)
- Release date: January 18, 2013
- Running time: 108 minutes
- Country: United States
- Language: English
- Budget: $35–56.8 million
- Box office: $34.7 million

Broken City is a 2013 American crime thriller film directed by Allen Hughes and written by Brian Tucker. Mark Wahlberg stars as a police officer turned private investigator and Russell Crowe as the mayor of New York City who hires the private detective to investigate his wife. It is supported by Catherine Zeta-Jones, Barry Pepper, Kyle Chandler, Natalie Martinez, and Jeffrey Wright.

This is Hughes' first solo feature film directing effort; in previous productions he collaborated with his twin brother Albert. Under a partnership between Emmett/Furla Films and Regency Enterprises, he began production in 2011 in New York City and Louisiana.

Broken City was released in theaters on January 18, 2013 by 20th Century Fox in the United States and by Inferno Distribution in other territories. It received negative reviews from critics and was a box-office bomb, grossing only $35 million against its $35–57 million production budget.

== Plot ==
New York Police Department police officer Billy Taggart is arrested for the murder of Mikey Tavarez. Earlier, Tavarez was tried for the rape and murder of 16-year-old Bolton Village resident Yesenia Barea but avoided a conviction due to a technicality. Chief Carl Fairbanks goes to Mayor of New York City Nicholas Hostetler with a witness and evidence incriminating Taggart, but Hostetler buries the evidence. A judge clears Taggart as having shot Tavarez in self-defense. In a private meeting with Taggart, the mayor calls him "a hero" but still forces him to leave the police department.

Seven years later, Taggart is living with his girlfriend Natalie Barrow, an aspiring actress. His private detective business is on the verge of bankruptcy. One day, Hostetler contacts Taggart and hires him to investigate his wife, Cathleen Hostetler, who might be having an affair. With his assistant Katy Bradshaw, Taggart learns that Cathleen is visiting Paul Andrews, campaign manager of Jack Valliant, Hostetler's rival in the upcoming elections. At a fundraiser for Hostetler's campaign, Cathleen reveals to Taggart that she knows he has been following her and advises him not to trust Hostetler. Taggart gives Hostetler photos of Cathleen meeting with Andrews.

At the debut screening of Natalie's film, she reveals that her real name is Natalia Barea and that Yesenia was her sister. Taggart is shocked at Natalie's sex scene and strongly disapproves. Taggart begins drinking excessively; after an argument with Natalie, she breaks off the relationship. He receives a phone call from Katy and rushes to a crime scene to learn that Andrews has been murdered.

Taggart tells Fairbanks, now the commissioner, of his work for Hostetler. They learn that Valliant was in Andrews' apartment. Valliant reveals that Andrews was scheduled to meet Todd Lancaster, the son of Hostetler's wealthy benefactor, contractor Sam Lancaster. A furious Cathleen tells Taggart that Andrews was a close friend, not her lover, and had promised her information about Hostetler's plans for the Bolton Village Housing Project, expected to enrich both Sam Lancaster and the mayor. Hostetler wanted to discover Cathleen's source, so he manipulated Taggart into tracking her.

To investigate Mayor Hostetler for corruption, Taggart goes to Lancaster's construction business and finds workers destroying documents. Reading a portion of the discarded documents, he discovers that Bolton Village has been sold to build high-rise office buildings, rather than a new housing development, leaving hundreds homeless including Barea's parents and erasing graffiti in memory of Yesenia on a building wall while Hostetler and Lancaster profit. Taggart is pursued in a car chase by Hostetler's men, who run him off the road and take back the documents. Taggart then visits Todd Lancaster, who says he had intended to give a copy of the demolition contract - evidence against Hostetler - to Andrews on the night he was murdered, before giving it to Taggart. Taggart confronts Hostetler, who is unfazed, and reveals a video showing Taggart murdering Tavarez in cold blood. Taggart records their conversation of the mayor admitting to his own corrupt dealings.

Despite the risk of prosecution for Taverez's murder, Taggart turns the recording over to Fairbanks. While Hostetler is at home celebrating a successful debate, Fairbanks arrives to arrest him (and reveals that he is the lover of his wife). In the film's final scene, Taggart meets Fairbanks at a bar, and they toast to Valliant, who has won the election. Katy comes in to say goodbye before the two men leave the bar.

== Cast ==
- Mark Wahlberg as Billy Taggart
- Russell Crowe as Mayor Nicholas Hostetler
- Catherine Zeta-Jones as Cathleen Hostetler
- Barry Pepper as Jack Valliant
- Kyle Chandler as Paul Andrews
- Natalie Martinez as Natalie Barrow
- Jeffrey Wright as Carl Fairbanks
- Alona Tal as Katy Bradshaw
- Michael Beach as Tony Jansen
- James Ransone as Todd Lancaster
- Griffin Dunne as Sam Lancaster
- Justin Chambers as Ryan Blake
- Gregory Jbara as Mike
- Dana Gourrier as Cop

== Production ==
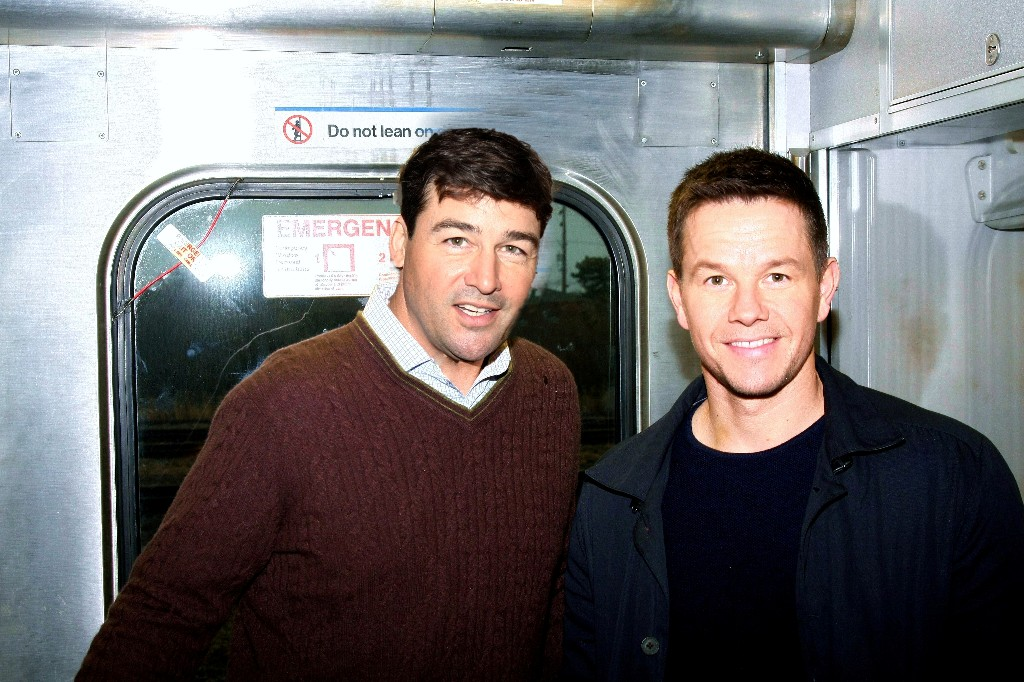
Walhberg and Chandler during filming in Montauk, New York

Broken City was directed by Allen Hughes and written by Brian Tucker. In May 2008, Mandate Pictures bought Tucker's unsolicited screenplay intending to hire a director and cast to film later in the year. In the following July, Mandate entered a deal with the production company Mr. Mudd to jointly produce one film per year, the first being Broken City. The companies aimed to hire the cast and crew by late 2008. Production did not commence as planned, and the project remained in an incomplete state of development. It became part of the film industry's 2008 black list of "best, albeit unproduced, screenplays".

In June 2011, Emmett/Furla Films began development of Broken City with an anticipated budget of $60 million. Allen Hughes was attached to direct. By the following October, Regency Enterprises joined the project to co-finance with Emmett/Furla Films. Variety reported that Regency founder Arnon Milchan wanted to produce "edgier fare" like it previously did with the 1990s films Heat and L.A. Confidential. This would be Hughes' first feature film directing effort without his twin brother Albert. (Allen also directed the TV movie Knights of the South Bronx (2005) and a few episodes of the American version of the TV series Touching Evil.) Hughes said about working alone: "The issue is learning that you're going to be in a room sometimes, and there's going to be eight guys assaulting you, creatively. Back in the day, when it was me and him, they could have had 15 people in the room, and they were all getting laid out." He met Tucker in 2010 at the Palm restaurant in West Hollywood, where he learned about the screenwriter's Broken City.

With a production budget of $35 million, shooting began in New York City in November 2011. Filming also took place in the Carrollton neighborhood of New Orleans and in other parts of Louisiana.

== Release ==
Broken City was released in 2,620 theaters in the United States and Canada on January 18, 2013. The film competed with fellow openers Mama and The Last Stand, as well as Silver Linings Playbook in its widening release. The Los Angeles Times said the film drew "the most interest from older audiences".

Prior to Broken City's release, Variety reported that the film was estimated to have "a low to mid-teens opening" weekend. It grossed $8.3 million on Friday through Sunday, ranking fifth. It grossed $9.5 million through the holiday (Martin Luther King, Jr. Day) on Monday. Broken City grossed $19,701,164 in the United States and Canada.

== Home media ==
Broken City was released on DVD and Blu-ray on April 30, 2013.

== Critical reception ==
On review aggregator website Rotten Tomatoes, the film holds an approval rating of 26% based on 152 reviews, with an average rating of 4.70/10. The site's critics consensus reads: "Broken City's thinly sketched, formulaic script offers meager rewards for all but the least demanding noir aficionados." Metacritic gives the film a weighted average score of 49 out of 100, based on 38 critics, indicating "mixed or average reviews". Audiences polled by CinemaScore gave the film an average grade of "B" on an A+ to F scale.

Emily Helwig wrote for The Hollywood Reporter, that critics "have been less than thrilled" with Broken City: "While many praise the talented cast and others enjoyed the cinematography, some critics add that Brian Tucker's screenplay might have been the problem and that it may have been a better story told as a period piece." Michael Phillips of the Chicago Tribune praises the cinematography of Ben Seresin, describing it as having an "autumnal glow", but criticizes the "coincidence and improbability" of the script, which lets down the able cast. Richard Roeper gave it 3 out of 4 stars, criticizing the script but saying, "It's pretty trashy and sometimes stupid. But there was never a moment when I wasn't entertained on one level or another."

== See also ==
- List of films featuring fictional films
