= Susanna Jones =

British writer (born 1967)

Susanna Jones (born 1967) is a British writer. Her debut novel, The Earthquake Bird won the John Llewellyn Rhys Prize a Betty Trask Award and the Crime Writers' Association John Creasy Dagger.

== Biography ==
Born in Hull, Jones spent her childhood in Hornsea in the East Riding of Yorkshire. Her father was a University Professor and her mother a teacher then School Inspector. She studied drama at Royal Holloway University in London where she became interested in Japanese culture through her study of Noh theatre. After graduating in 1988 she then travelled to Japan where she taught English in Nagoya on the JET Programme, spent two years in Turkey then returned to Japan in 1994 where she lived and worked in Chiba. Later moving to Tokyo where she worked as a radio script editor. and presenter for NHK Radio. Whilst in Tokyo she started writing her first novel, which was set in the city. In 1996 she studied for an MA in Novel Writing at the University of Manchester and taught Fiction Writing at the University of Exeter from 2003 to 2005. She now lives near Brighton and lectures in Creative Writing at Royal Holloway.

== Bibliography ==
- The Earthquake Bird (2001)
- Water Lily (2003)
- The Missing Person's Guide to Love (2007)
- When Nights Were Cold (2012)
