= Leopold Ross =

English musician and record producer (born 1980)

- Also known as: Leo Ross
- Born: 23 October 1980 (age 46); London, England
- Occupations: Musician, record producer, recording engineer
- Labels: Epitaph Records, S2 Records, Reprise Records, Iamsound Records, Sargent House Records, Sacred Bones Records

Leopold "Leo" Ross is an English musician, composer, record producer and recording engineer. He is a Grammy Award nominee and two-time Primetime Emmy Award nominee, receiving Grammy recognition for Shōgun in the category of Best Score Soundtrack for Visual Media, and Emmy nominations for Outstanding Music Composition for a Series and Outstanding Original Main Title Theme Music for the same series.. He is also the recipient of a Society of Composers & Lyricists Award and a Hollywood Music in Media Award for his work on ‘‘Shōgun’’."Atticus Ross, Leopold Ross, and Nick Chuba's Shōgun Score Wins SCL Award for Outstanding Original Score for a Television Production". Society of Composers & Lyricists. 12 February 2025."HMMA Winners". Hollywood Music in Media Awards.. His film and television credits include Apple’s Godzilla franchise ‘Monarch: Legacy Of Monsters', 'Black Mirror', and 'Dr Death'. His film scoring career began with The Hughes brothers 2010 film ‘The Book Of Eli’. He has gone on to create scores for acclaimed directors Michael Mann (Blackhat), Harmony Korine (Rebel), and John Hillcoat (Triple Nine).

== Career ==
Leopold was a founding member of eclectic rock band Nojahoda who released one album on Sony S2 Records in 1999.

In 2003 he joined his brother Atticus Ross, as well as Bad Religion member Brett Gurewitz in the punk/hardcore band Error. Along with temporary vocalist Greg Puciato, the band recorded and released a well received EP on Epitaph Records in 2004. Around this time Leopold also began his scoring career, composing the music for the USA Network show Touching Evil alongside Atticus Ross and Claudia Sarne.

Outside of his scoring work, Leopold has written, recorded, produced and performed with various noted acts including Bad Religion, Grace Jones, Korn, Dillinger Escape Plan, Rancid, The Transplants, Five Finger Death Punch, Brigitte Fontaine, The Big Pink, Io Echo and Brett Anderson.

== Personal life ==
Ross has five siblings, including model Liberty Ross and Atticus Ross, who is also a musician. His maternal grandfather was Miles Lampson, 1st Baron Killearn. He is of part Italian descent through his great-grandfather, Aldo Castellani.

== Selected credits ==
Band, artist, show or movie	Song or album	Year	Credits
Nojahoda	Jahoda Witness	1999	Guitar, vocals
Error	Error EP	2004	Guitar, programming
Bad Religion	Beyond Electric Dreams	2004	Sonic Alienator
Touching Evil	Music to accompany series	2004	Co-writer, guitar, production
Korn	See You on the Other Side, Tearjerker	2005	Producer, production assistant, co-writer (Tearjerker)
The Notorious B.I.G.	Duets: The Final Chapter	2005	Production assistant
Korn	Untitled	2007	Production assistant
Grace Jones	Devil In My Life	2008	Co-writer, guitar
Five Finger Death Punch	Never Enough	2008	Co-writer
New York, I Love You	Movie soundtrack ("Allen Hughes" segment)	2009	Co-composer
The Book of Eli	Movie score	2010	Co-composer, Performer
Fear and the Nervous System	Fear and the Nervous System	2011	Programming, guitar, co-producer, co-writer
Io Echo	Ministry of Love	2013	Producer, guitar, co-writer
Broken City	Movie score	2013	Composer, With Atticus Ross & Claudia Sarne
Blackhat	Movie score	2015	Composer, With Atticus Ross
Love & Mercy	Movie score	2014	Composer, With Atticus Ross
Triple 9	Movie score	2016	Composer, With Atticus Ross, Claudia Sarne & Bobby Krlic
Almost Holy	Movie score	2016	Composer, With Atticus Ross & Bobby Krlic
The Defiant Ones	Television score	2017	Composer, With Atticus Ross & Claudia Sarne
Death Note	Movie score	2017	Composer, With Atticus Ross
Black Mirror	"Crocodile" (season 4, episode 3)	2017	Composer, With Atticus Ross
Corazón	Movie score	2018	Composer, With Atticus Ross
A Million Little Pieces	Movie score	2018	Composer, With Atticus Ross
Earthquake Bird	Movie score	2019	Composer, With Atticus Ross
Monarch: Legacy of Monsters	Television score	2023–present	Composer
Shōgun	Television score	2024	Composer, With Atticus Ross and Nick Chuba
Don't Die: The Man Who Wants to Live Forever	Movie score	2025	Composer, With Nick Chuba and Matt Cohen
Blade Runner 2099	Television score	2026	Composer
