= Hughes brothers =

American film directors, producers and screenwriters (born 1972)

Allen and Albert Hughes
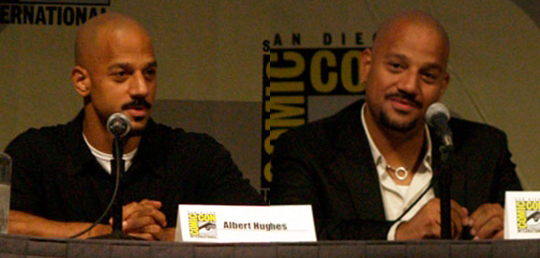
- Albert (left) and Allen (right) in 2009
- Born: April 1, 1972 (age 54); Detroit, Michigan, U.S.
- Other name: The Hughes Brothers
- Education: Albert: Los Angeles City College
- Occupation: Filmmakers
- Years active: 1993–present

Albert Hughes and Allen Hughes (born April 1, 1972), known together professionally as the Hughes Brothers, are American twin brother filmmakers. They are known for films, including Menace II Society (1993), Dead Presidents (1995), From Hell (2001), and The Book of Eli (2010). They did most of their collaborations between 1993 and 2001. They have primarily worked separately since Albert moved to Prague in 2004, with The Book of Eli being the only film they have directed together following his move.

== Early lives ==
Albert and Allen Hughes were born in Detroit on April 1, 1972, the twin sons of Armenian-American mother Aida and African-American father Albert Hughes. Aida's family were Iranian-Armenians from Tehran. Albert is older by nine minutes. Although they originally believed themselves to be fraternal twins, the brothers now suspect they may be identical despite not having had a DNA test. Their parents divorced when they were two years old. At the age of nine, the brothers moved with their mother to Claremont, California, where she raised them alone while putting herself through school and starting her own vocational center. Supportive of her sons' ambitions as filmmakers, she gave them a video camera when they were 12. They spent their free time making short films, and when a teacher suggested that they make a "How-To" film for an assignment, they created the short film How to Be a Burglar.

== Career ==
Allen and singer Stevvi Alexander had a son together at the age of 18, prompting the twins to drop out of high school and begin working on music videos. They soon directed for artists such as Tone Loc and Tupac Shakur. Their first feature film, 1993's Menace II Society, premiered at the Cannes Film Festival. The film centered on a young black man from LA who wanted out of the gang life. It was made on a budget of $3.5 million when they were 20 years old. Tyger Williams wrote the screenplay, and shared story credit with the brothers. It became a critical as well as a box office success and was nominated for an Independent Spirit Award for Best First Feature. Because of their previous experience in directing music videos, they became the first sibling duo since Jerry and David Zucker allowed a waiver by the Directors Guild of America to take co-credit as directors.

Their second film was Dead Presidents in 1995. The film dealt with a young black man who served in Vietnam and how he dealt with society upon his return. Like their feature film debut, and also starring Larenz Tate, the film centered on war veterans during the racially charged Vietnam War era. The film, which was released at the New York Critics Film Festival, failed to make as much of a profit as their first film. They followed Dead Presidents with American Pimp, a feature-length documentary about the underground pimp culture and exploitation of women. It premiered at the 1999 Sundance Film Festival. They had originally set out to do an adaptation of Iceberg Slim's novel Pimp, but someone else acquired the rights. The brothers have stated that the film's perspective was partially shaped by being raised by their mother, who is a feminist and a lesbian. In between projects, they filmed several anti-handgun public service announcements.

In a departure from their previous material, the Hughes brothers co-directed From Hell, the 2001 film adaptation of Alan Moore's graphic novel of the same name about the Jack the Ripper murders in Victorian England, starring Johnny Depp and Heather Graham. Considered too violent and gory by some critics, the film had to be edited in order to avoid an NC-17 rating by the MPAA. As described by the film's star, there were sometimes disagreements between the twins regarding the direction of the film. For example, the amount of shown violence was a point of contention between the two; one brother thought the brutality should be shown, while the other believed implied violence would suffice.

Their only film together since 2001's From Hell was the post-apocalyptic drama Book of Eli, which was released in January 2010.

In 2006, the brothers were announced as directing The Iceman, a film about serial killer Richard Kuklinski, but it was eventually directed by Ariel Vromen, and released in 2012. They were also slated to direct a film version of the classic TV series Kung Fu. It was announced in 2010 that the brothers were tapped to direct a live-action adaptation of the 1988 manga Akira, but they left the project in 2011.

When the brothers collaborate, Allen typically works with the actors while Albert handles the technical aspects of their films, stemming from his experience of studying at Los Angeles City College's film school.

== Solo projects ==
=== Allen ===
Allen directed a few episodes of the American version of the TV series Touching Evil (for which his brother was an executive producer) as well as the 2005 television feature Knights of the South Bronx.

In 2009, Allen directed a segment of New York, I Love You, starring Drea De Matteo and Bradley Cooper.

Allen Hughes directed the 2013 film Broken City, a crime thriller starring Mark Wahlberg and Russell Crowe. He directed the four-part 2017 HBO documentary miniseries The Defiant Ones, about music producers Jimmy Iovine and Dr. Dre.

=== Albert ===
In 2005, it was announced that Albert would direct a feature film called Art Con, although no further news was reported on its development.

In December 2012, Albert Hughes announced that he would be producing an online video series using the Crysis 3 game engine called The 7 Wonders of Crysis 3.

In 2018, Albert Hughes directed his first solo feature film, Alpha. The film was written by Daniele Sebastian Wiedenhaupt, based on a story written by Hughes, and holds an approval rating of 79% on review aggregator website Rotten Tomatoes.

== Personal lives ==
Known as much for their frank manner as for their films, the brothers have been known to get into altercations. They took rapper Tupac Shakur to court in 1994 after he assaulted them during a music video shoot. Shakur had originally been slated to star in Menace II Society, but was replaced after the incident, which apparently stemmed from him disliking the role they had chosen for him. He was later sentenced to 15 days in jail for the assault, as well as another incident that occurred the day before his sentencing.

The brothers are open about their marijuana use and have turned down offers to make anti-marijuana commercials.

Allen and singer Stevvi Alexander have a son together named Eric, who was born while the two were in high school. Albert has a daughter named Adrienne, and has lived in Prague since 2004. Albert said of his relationship with Allen in 2013, "I think the relationship is just much more complex now than it used to be. We love each other, and in the end we're still the best of friends. We're the only people we're going to call [when stressful things happen] but we're kind of in a weird dance right now."

== Filmography ==
Year	Title	Directors	Producers	Story	Notes
1993	Menace II Society	Yes	Yes	Yes	Also executive soundtrack producers
1995	Dead Presidents	Yes	Yes	Yes	Also executive soundtrack producers
1999	American Pimp	Yes	Yes	No	Documentary
2001	From Hell	Yes	Executive	No	
2010	The Book of Eli	Yes	No	No	

=== Solo works ===
Allen Hughes

Year	Title	Director	Producer	Writer	Notes
2005	Knights of the South Bronx	Yes	No	No	TV movie
2008	New York, I Love You	Yes	No	No	1 segment
2013	Broken City	Yes	Yes	No	
2017	The Defiant Ones	Yes	Executive	Yes	Documentary mini-series
2023	Dear Mama	Yes	Executive	Yes	Documentary mini-series

Albert Hughes

Year	Title	Director	Producer	Notes
2018	Alpha	Yes	Yes	Also story writer
2020	The Good Lord Bird	Yes	Executive	Episode "Meet the Lord"
2023	The Continental: From the World of John Wick	Yes	Executive	2 episodes

== See also ==
- List of twins
