= Moog Werkstatt-Ø1 =

Analogue synthesizer

Werkstatt-Ø1
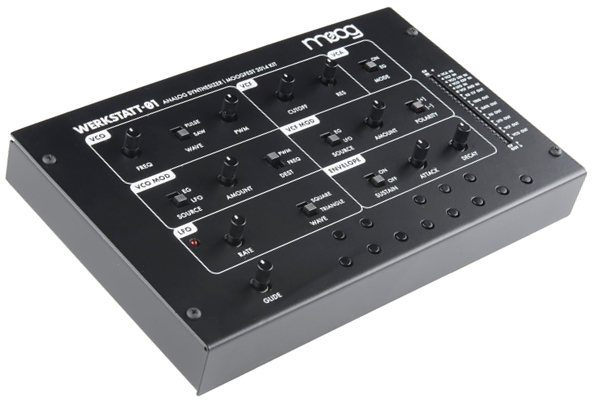
- Manufacturer: Moog Music
- Dates: 2014, 2020
- Price: £249 GBP $329 US (2014) $199 US (2020)

Technical specifications
- Polyphony: Monophonic
- Oscillator: 1 (Pulse, Saw Down, Saw Up, Square)
- LFO: 1 (Square, Triangle)
- Synthesis type: Analogue
- Filter: 1 (Low-pass filter
- Attenuator: Attack, decay, sustain
- Effects: 4-pole ladder filter

Input/output
- Keyboard: 13 note button keyboard
- External control: CV IN, CV OUT

The Werkstatt-Ø1 is an educational tool and a compact analog synthesizer from Moog. It was designed to give people a thorough understanding of how synthesizers work. There is only one oscillator with a frequency control allowing tuning from 8Hz up to 16kHz, and a 4-pole ladder filter with cutoff and resonance control.

== Assembly ==
To assemble the Werkstatt-Ø1 you have to screw the printed circuit onto a metal chassis.

== See also ==
- Moog modular synthesizer
- Multimoog
- Micromoog
- Moog Rogue
- Minimoog
- Minimoog Voyager
