= Moog Grandmother =

Synthesizer

Grandmother
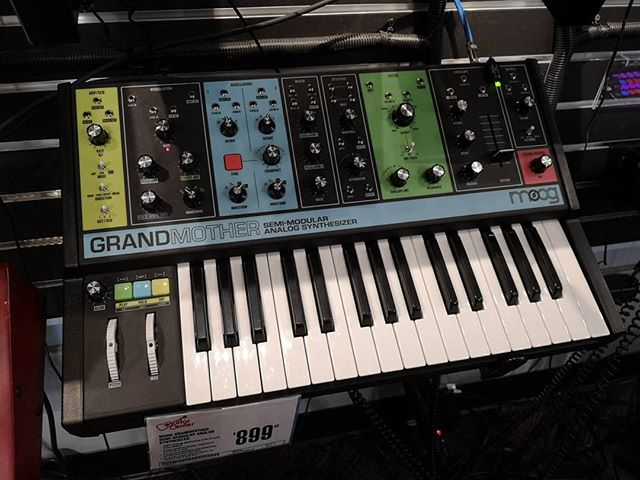
- Moog Grandmother
- Manufacturer: Moog Music Inc.
- Dates: 2018
- Price: £879.00 $899.00

Technical specifications
- Polyphony: Monophonic
- Oscillator: 2 Analogue Oscillators
- LFO: 3rd Analog Oscillator with knob range 0.1Hz-1.3kHz, range can be extended via patching
- Synthesis type: Analogue
- Filter: 4-Pole 10Hz-20kHz Ladder filter Patchable 1-Pole High-pass filter,
- Attenuator: Analog ADSR Envelope Generator, KB Release Envelope Generator
- Aftertouch expression: No
- Velocity expression: Yes patchable from 3.5mm jack
- Storage memory: 3 sequences, 256 notes each
- Effects: Hardware Spring Reverb

Input/output
- Keyboard: 32 Fatar keyboard
- Left-hand control: Pitch Wheel, Modulation Wheel, Arpeggiator, Sequencer, and Octave tact switch controls
- External control: DIN MIDI In, Out, Thru, USB MIDI, 22 CV/Audio Inputs

The Grandmother is an analog semi-modular subtractive, 32-key synthesizer released by Moog Music Inc., incorporating circuits based on the Moog modular synthesizer Model 15 and the Minimoog.

Moog’s Grandmother is a two-oscillator analog mono-synth. It has a semi-modular architecture. This means that unlike a fully modular system, it has a hard-wired (or normaled) signal path and will play without the use of patch cables. Through patching, the musician can add on, or override the hard-wired signal path, extending the possible sound palette of the synthesizer.

The keyboard section of the synth includes 32 full-size keys, pitch and modulation wheels, a glide (portamento) knob, and buttons to control playback of the built-in arpeggiator/sequencer. The machine can be MIDI-controlled. Patches cannot be saved, one needs to create the sound on the fly. To remember created sounds, templates are included in the manual and in pdf format where the musician can draw the patches for later use. There are no built in patches either, but the manual shows different patches and different patch books are available.

== Inputs and outputs ==
There is a 1/4” audio input accepting instrument level. All modules have Eurorack compatible 3.5mm minijack waveform and CV inputs and outputs for patching: 22 inputs and 21 outputs. The spring reverb has a separate Eurorack compatible input and output which allows the reverb to be used as a standalone effect for other sound sources. The instrument input has no volume control but is inserted into the amp section. This means the instrument input goes through the voltage-controlled low-pass filter, the reverb and the voltage-controlled amplifier.

MIDI in, out and through are available through the DIN connectors. There is also a USB MIDI interface for straight connection to a computer. The arpeggiator/sequencer clock can be sent out through MIDI, or it can receive an external MIDI clock. The clock is also sent out through a CV clock out. The arpeggiator/sequencer section can also be controlled by a CV clock in, on/off in and resetting.

Audio output is available through a single mono TS jack and a 3.5mm minijack Eurorack level output. The Eurorack output is not influenced by the master volume control.

== Sounds ==
The synthesizer is capable of producing multi-harmonic sounds and modulation.

== See also ==
- Moog modular synthesizer
- Multimoog
- Micromoog
- Moog Rogue
- Minimoog
- Minimoog Voyager
