= Moog Sonic Six =

Duophonic analog synthesizer

Sonic Six
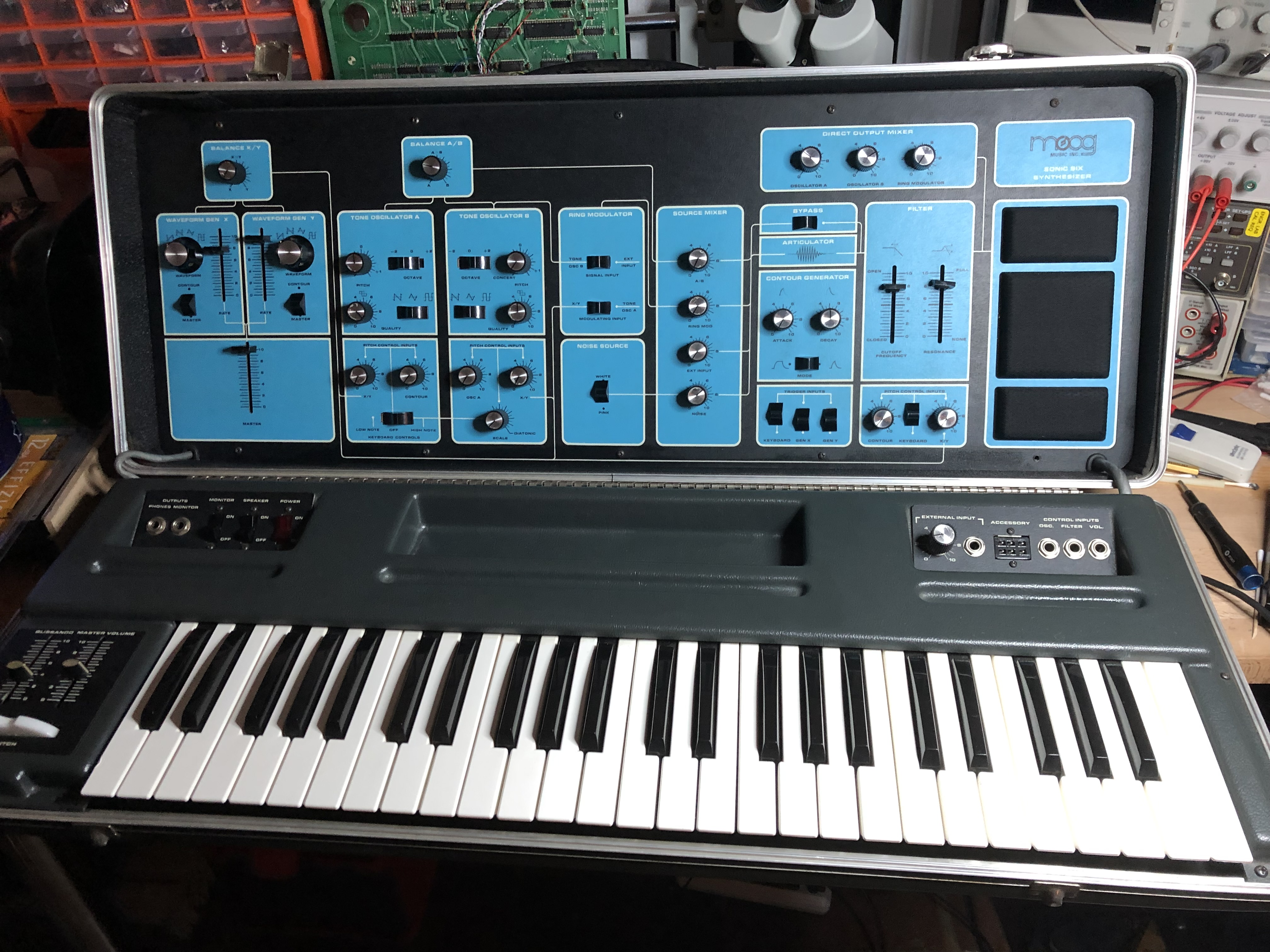
- Sonic Six
- Manufacturer: Moog Music
- Dates: 1971 - 1979

Technical specifications
- Polyphony: 2
- Oscillator: 2
- LFO: 2
- Synthesis type: Analog Subtractive
- Filter: low-pass
- Storage memory: none
- Effects: none

Input/output
- Keyboard: 49 keys
- External control: CV/Gate

The Moog Sonic Six is a duophonic analog synthesizer that was manufactured by Moog Music from 1972 to 1979. Because of its portable design and built-in speaker, the Sonic Six was widely used for lectures and educational purposes, often by Bob Moog himself.

== Musonics Origins ==
The Sonic Six is the result of Bill Waytena, then the owner of synthesizer manufacturer muSonics, acquiring R.A. Moog Inc. By 1969, almost everyone at Moog except Bob Moog saw the need for a small portable synthesiser. When Moog engineer Gene Zumchak left Moog, he took the idea to his relative, businessman Bill Waytena, who set up MuSonics and had Zumchak design the Sonic V synthesiser, with considerable help from Fred Reinagel. It didn’t sell well, and Waytena bought the struggling R.A. Moog Inc., moved the company to Buffalo, New York, and renamed it Moog/Musonics (which eventually was shortened to simply Moog Music). It was under this new brand that a new version of the Musonics Sonic V was released as the Moog Music Sonic Six.

== Design ==
The Sonic V wooden case was replaced by a large briefcase type case; the upper control panel folds and latches over the keyboard to ease transportation and storage. This feature was used by a few synthesizer manufacturers of the time and was one of the options considered for the MiniMoog, however the Sonic Six was Moog Music's only product that incorporated this into its design. The Sonic Six is also the only Moog synthesizer that featured a built-in speaker rather than requiring the user to use an external amplifier, a feature aimed at education use. Unlike the MiniMoog there is no modulation wheel, and the pitch bend wheel has a design unique among Moog units. It is spring-loaded, so it returns to center automatically, and is mounted horizontally, similar to later Roland pitch benders. The Sonic Six initially retained the diode-ladder filter Zumchak and Reinagel had used to avoid the Moog filter patent.

The Sonic Six features two VCOs with changeable waveform (sawtooth, triangle, square, pulse), one low-pass VCF, a ring modulator, a VCA, two multimode LFOs for modulation and a 49-note keyboard.

The Sonic Six is a two-oscillator duophonic synth. It can be set for duophonic, (two notes at a time... one oscillator takes high-note priority and one oscillator takes low note priority), monophonic (both oscs), or monophonic with a drone (one osc changes pitch, one does not). Available waveshapes are pulse (variable), saw, and triangle. The pitch of each oscillator can be controlled by dual LFO, one by contour, and the other by the other oscillator. One can adjust the temperament of the Sonic Six to play scales that have less than 12 notes per octave. The Sonic Six also features pink or white noise. Although the oscillators are temperature-regulated, their pitch tends to drift, as on many analog synths.

The Dual LFO design is unique. A mix control allows mixing of each LFO source, while voltage control of each LFO allows additional rate control not often seen in portable synthesizers. Each LFO can produce saw, reverse saw, triangle, and square wave outputs. The Sonic Six also features a ring modulator which allows a player to produce non-chromatic sounds. Audio signals may also be routed through the filter and ring modulator via an external input.

The Sonic Six's contour generator is a vary basic design as compared to other synthesizer models. Attack and release are settable. Sustain is set by a switch, offering infinite (while a key is held) or zero sustain times. Only a single contour generator is shared by both the VCA and filter. The filter is standard -24dB/oct Butterworth filter design featuring filter cutoff, resonance, keyboard control switch, contour amount, and LFO amount. The Sonic Six also features “glissando”, another word for portamento. This can be assigned to both oscillators or just one, depending upon the setting. The Sonic Six also features a built in amplifier and speaker, as well as a standard line level output.

The Sonic Six inherited some poor design features from the Sonic V and had a reputation for unreliability, made worse by the portable case’s instability. A high proportion of new Sonic Sixes were returned to Moog for repair, and within Moog it acquired the nickname “chronic sick”. The instrument layout and built-in speaker were optimised for educational use, but with only a single very basic envelope generator and a weak sound compared with the Minimoog it was not a popular choice for musicians. From serial number 1300, the Sonic Six was redesigned, headed by David Luce, notably replacing the diode ladder filter with a Moog transistor filter and placing the VCA after the VCF, but the instrument still sounded weak compared to the MiniMoog.
