= Slim Phatty =

Monophonic analogue synthesizer

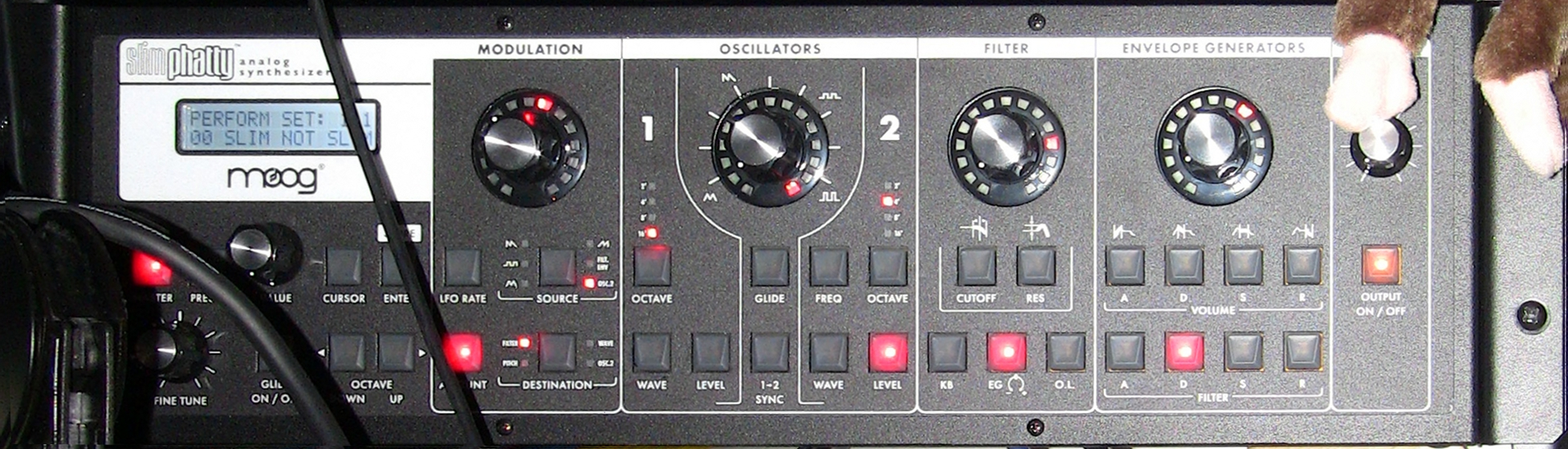
- Slim Phatty
- Manufacturer: Moog Music
- Dates: 2011- 2014
- Price: $849

Technical specifications
- Polyphony: Monophonic
- Oscillator: 2
- LFO: 1
- Synthesis type: Analog subtractive
- Filter: 1 selectable 6, 12, 18 or 24dB/octave low-pass
- Attenuator: ADSR
- Aftertouch expression: no
- Velocity expression: filter cutoff only
- Storage memory: 100 patches
- Effects: none

Input/output
- Keyboard: no
- External control: MIDI, CV/Gate, USB

The Slim Phatty is a monophonic analog synthesizer manufactured by Moog Music from 2011–2014. It is considered to be an entry-level synthesizer in the Moog family. Its design is based on the Little Phatty, which in turn is a more modernized version of the Minimoog Voyager. It is among the first synthesizers created and produced following the death of Moog founder Robert Moog in 2005. The Slim Phatty is also the first Moog (beside the Little Phatty) that is capable of USB connectivity. It was inferred that Moog would be releasing a new and possibly more stripped down synthesizer when reports surfaced that Moog had registered a trademark for the name "Slim Phatty".

== Features ==
The Slim Phatty is able to make use of MIDI controller integration via out, in, and "thru" channels. The only other Moog synthesizers that can boast this capability are the Little Phatty, Minimoog Voyager, and the early Memorymoog+. It also features two robust oscillators, diverse tuning controls, and the patented “Moog Ladder” filters. Also included are a large number of patches or preset sound settings. Unlike many synthesizers, it does not possess a keyboard, so a MIDI or other sound input is required in order to create sound to modulate or filter. It is also small in size, and weighing in at roughly 5.5 lbs. For these reasons, the Slim Phatty is useful in both studio recording and live playing.

=== Comparison to Little Phatty ===
As noted above, the Slim Phatty is essentially a stripped down version of Moog's Little Phatty. Moog removed the keyboard, as well as the pitch and modulator wheels, and compacted the entire setup into a unit that is only seventeen inches wide. For these reasons, many may find the control panel a little cluttered, although the use of smaller knobs and buttons helps alleviate this issue. Like its counterpart, the Slim Phatty possesses an "Overload" control, which acts a filter drive that "supercharges" the filter and sound. It also shares firmware versions with the Little Phatty, which gives it more flexibility - such as integration with the Little Phatty in polyphonic mode. Its lightweight and small size also give it an edge in regards to portability.

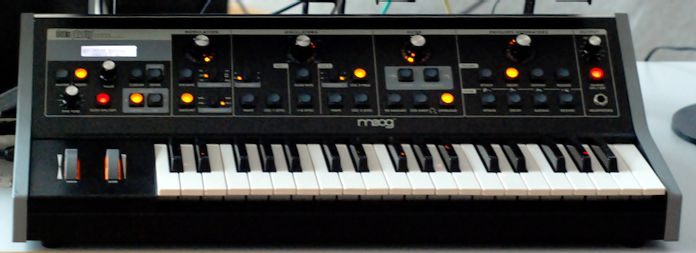
Little Phatty Stage Edition (2006-)
