= Moog Opus 3 =

Monophonic analogue synthesizer

Opus 3
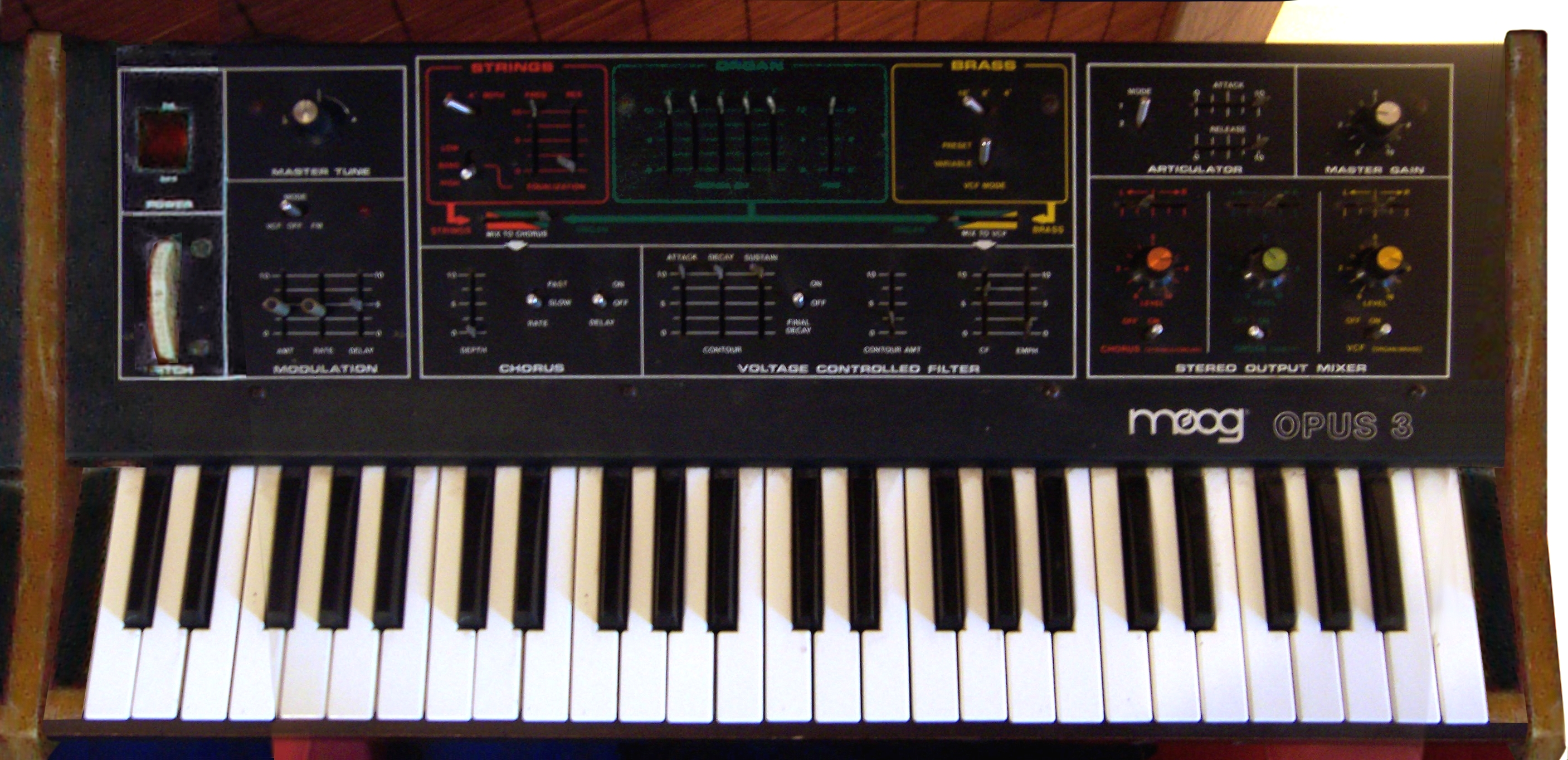
- Manufacturer: Moog
- Dates: 1980

Technical specifications
- Polyphony: full (paraphonic)
- Timbrality: 1 part
- Oscillator: 1 (divide-down)
- LFO: Saw Up, Saw Down, Square, Triangle
- Synthesis type: Analog subtractive
- Filter: 24dB Slope (4-pole), Band Pass, High Pass, Low Pass, Resonance
- Attenuator: Attack, Decay, Sustain, Release
- Aftertouch expression: No
- Velocity expression: No
- Storage memory: None
- Effects: Chorus

Input/output
- Keyboard: 49 key
- Left-hand control: Pitch wheel
- External control: CV in, out

The Opus 3 is an analog 49-key synthesizer, and designed by Herbert A. Deutsch from Hofstra University. He also wrote the manual for the synthesizer. It was released in 1980 by Moog. The sounds are in three categories, strings, brass and organ sounds, all having their own filter apart from the organ section.

== Outputs ==
The Opus 3 features stereo outputs and can be programmed to use the panning effect.

== Notable sounds ==
The Opus 3 is mainly known for its electronic organ sounds; it also produces strings and brass sounds.

== Notable users ==
- Stereolab
- Kraftwerk
- 808 State
- The Rentals
- Charly García
- Ministry (band) - Same Old Madness (1982)

== See also ==
- List of Moog synthesizer players
- Moog Music
- Moog synthesizer
- Robert Moog
