= Mother-32 =

Semi-modular analogue synthesizer

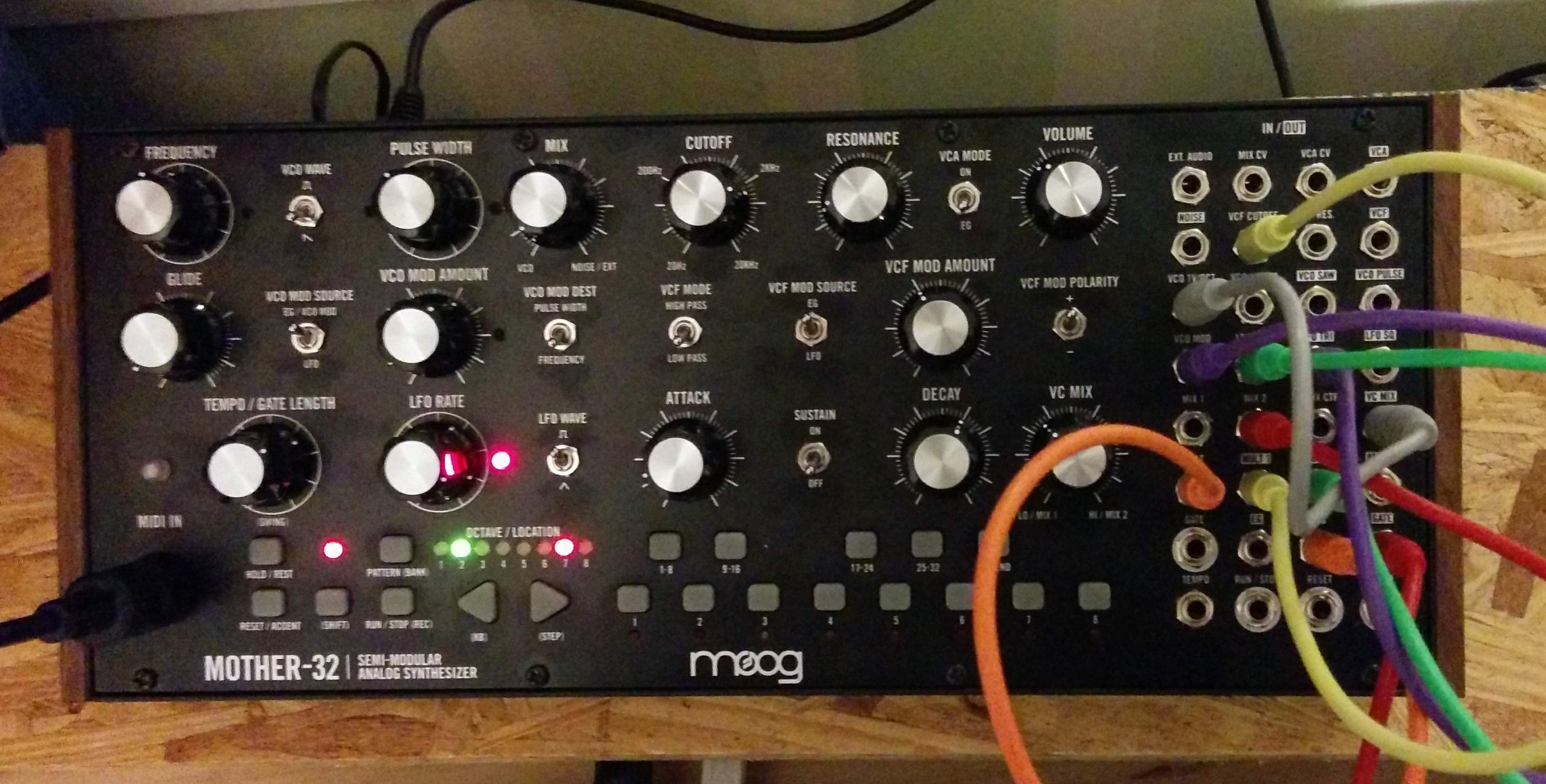
- Moog Mother-32 synthesizer
- Manufacturer: Moog Music Inc.
- Dates: 2015-present
- Price: $679.00

Technical specifications
- Polyphony: Monophonic
- Oscillator: 1 analog oscillator
- LFO: 1 triangle wave, square wave
- Synthesis type: Analog subtractive
- Filter: 1 state-variable (low-pass filter, high-pass filter)
- Attenuator: AR envelope generator
- Aftertouch expression: no
- Velocity expression: no
- Storage memory: 64 sequences, 32 notes each

Input/output
- Keyboard: 13 note keypad
- External control: DIN MIDI in

The Mother-32 is an analog semi-modular desktop synthesizer released by Moog Music Inc. in 2015.

The Mother-32 features an analog monophonic sound engine, a 13 note keypad, a step sequencer storing up to 64 sequences of up to 32 steps each, one voltage controlled oscillator with pulse and saw waveforms ranging from 8Hz to 8KHz (16KHz max with LFO/CV), one state-variable (low- and high-pass) voltage controlled filter, and a white noise generator. There are 32 individual 3.5 mm phone jack patch points for sound programming.

== Inputs ==
There is a 3.5 mm audio input on the patch panel for external audio input, and a DIN MIDI input jack.

== Eurorack compatibility ==
The Mother-32 front panel, with the synthesizer electronics attached, can be removed from the case and used as a 60 HP Eurorack module; the internal power connection and audio and CV inputs and outputs are Eurorack compatible.
