= Moog Sub 37 =

Monophonic analog synthesizer

Sub 37 / Subsequent 37 CV
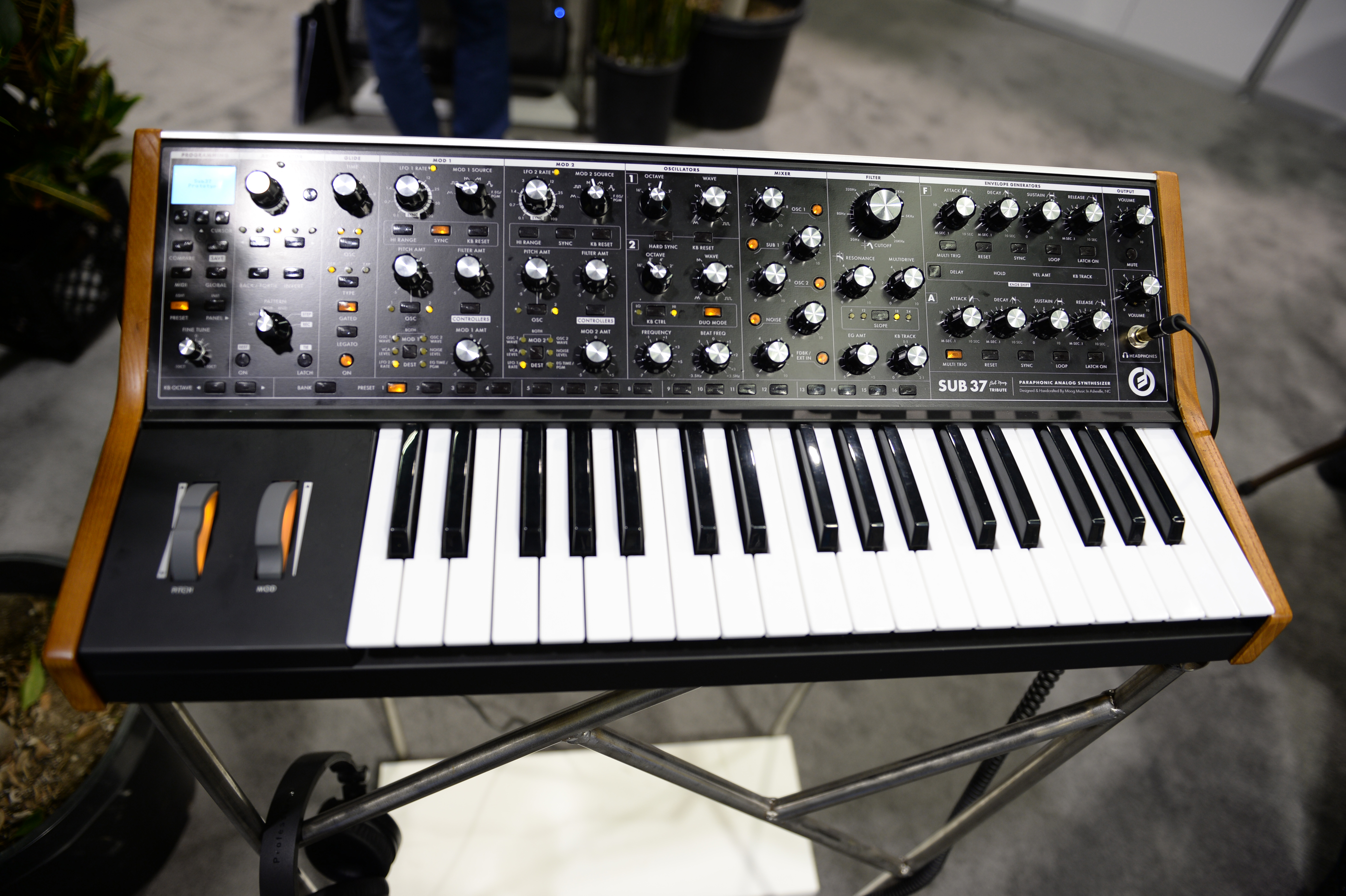
- Moog Sub 37 at NAMM, 2014
- Manufacturer: Moog Music
- Dates: 2014-present

Technical specifications
- Polyphony: Monophonic / Duophonic
- Timbrality: 2
- Oscillator: 2
- LFO: 2
- Synthesis type: Analog subtractive
- Filter: 1 selectable 6, 12, 18 or 24dB/octave low-pass
- Attenuator: ADSR
- Aftertouch expression: yes
- Velocity expression: yes
- Storage memory: 256 patches
- Effects: none

Input/output
- Keyboard: 37 keys
- External control: MIDI, CV/Gate

The Moog Sub 37 is a limited edition monophonic analog synthesizer manufactured by Moog Music from 2014. The synthesizer has an analog signal path and digital modulators.

In May 2017, Moog announced its successor, the Moog Subsequent 37 CV, which featured an additional four assignable CV outputs, and two gate output in a limited edition of 2000 units. A few months later, Moog brought out the Moog Subsequent 37 which does not include the four assignable CV outputs and two gate output.
