= Moog Satellite =

Monophonic analogue synthesizer

Satellite
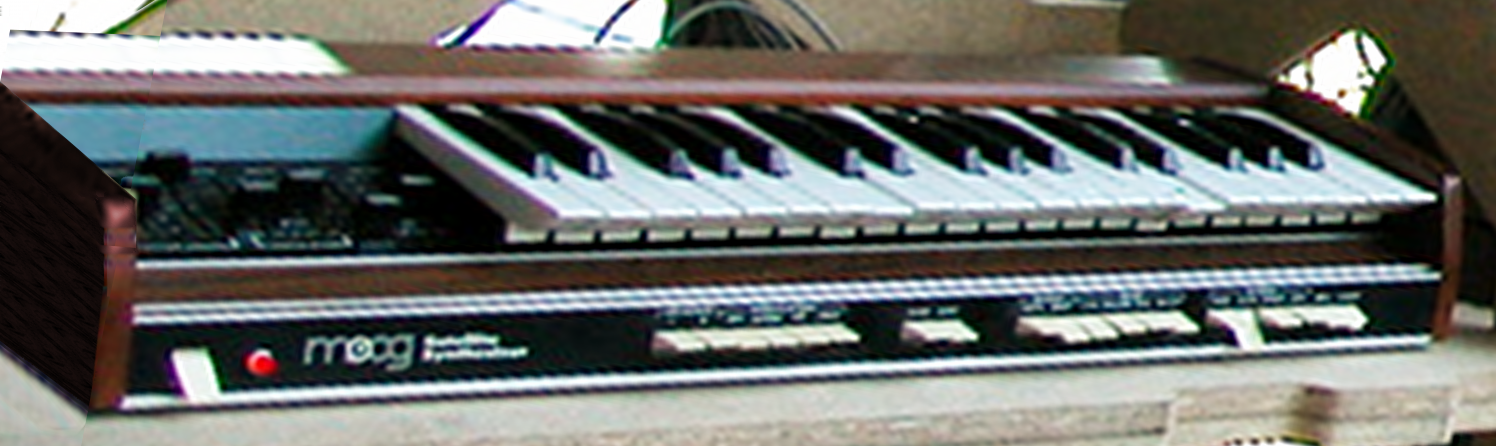
- Manufacturer: Moog Music
- Dates: 1973 - 1979

Technical specifications
- Polyphony: Monophonic
- Timbrality: Single
- Oscillator: 1 (Continuously variable from Sawtooth through Narrow Pulse, Wide Pulse, and finally, Square)
- LFO: 1 (Square & Sine)
- Synthesis type: Analogue Subtractive
- Filter: 2 - VC Band-pass into 2-pole, non-resonant VC Low-pass
- Attenuator: 2 (VCF pair & VCA) Attack / Decay with switchable Sustain & LFO Rate-Controlled Repeat on VCFs

Input/output
- Keyboard: 37 keys
- Left-hand control: Modulation, pitch bend
- External control: CV/gate in, out

The Satellite is a monophonic analog synthesizer that was manufactured by Moog Music from 1973 to 1979 in response to the ARP Soloist and ARP Pro Soloist. It had one VCO. It was designed for use with any organ or sound system. The American company Thomas Organ bought a license to build 5,000 stand-alone instruments (as the Thomas 1055) and also to build them into their organs. The case is mainly made out of wood.

== Preset sounds ==
- Brass - mute or open
- Reeds - Thin, hollow, full or bright
- Strings - bow, pluck, strike or pick
- Bell
- Lunar

There were additional tabs to select octave, modulation, glide and sustain, and sliders for filter, modulation, glide and volume.

An upgraded version, the MinitMoog added a second VCO and pressure (aftertouch).

== Notable users ==
- Vangelis
- Ronnie Foster
- Phil Ryan

== See also ==
- List of Moog synthesizer players
- Moog Music
- Moog synthesizer
- Robert Moog
