= Moog Little Phatty =

Monophonic analogue synthesizer

Little Phatty
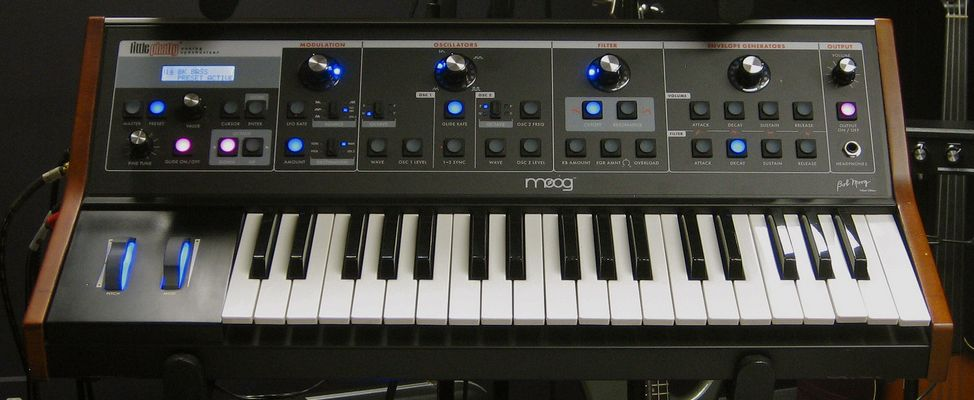
- Little Phatty Tribute Edition
- Manufacturer: Moog Music
- Dates: 2006-2013

Technical specifications
- Polyphony: monophonic
- Oscillator: 2
- LFO: 1
- Synthesis type: Analog subtractive
- Filter: 1 selectable 6, 12, 18 or 24dB/octave low-pass
- Attenuator: ADSR
- Aftertouch expression: no
- Velocity expression: yes
- Storage memory: 100 patches
- Effects: none

Input/output
- Keyboard: 37 keys
- External control: MIDI, CV/Gate

The Little Phatty is a monophonic analog synthesizer manufactured by Moog Music from 2006 to 2013, preceded by the Voyager and succeeded by Voyager Old School. Its design was conceived, in part, by Robert Moog himself, and is the last instrument to have that distinction, although the primary engineer was Cyril Lance. It is also the first Moog product to be produced following his death. Jordan Rudess of the band Dream Theater also assisted with the design of the product.

It is one of the few Moog synthesizers to utilize MIDI from the factory (the others being the Minimoog Voyager and the earlier Memorymoog+). This allows for better integration in the modern studio and for live performance.

On 9 September 2013, Moog Music announced the discontinuation of the Little Phatty analog synthesizer.

== Versions ==
There were four versions of the Little Phatty as well as the 'Slim Phatty' which was the instrument without a keyboard. Aside from a few cosmetic differences (and price), all units have nearly identical sound generation circuitry and controls.

=== Tribute Edition ===
The earlier 'Tribute Edition', a limited run of 1200 units, featured blue LED lighting, wooden side panels and Bob Moog's signature decaled onto the convex back panel.

=== Stage Edition ===
The later 'Stage Edition' featured orange and red lighting, grey rubberized panels and the classic Moog logo replacing the signature.

=== Stage II ===
The third version, called 'Stage II', had some minor mechanical and electrical tweaks as well as adding a USB interface, a new arpeggiator and tap tempo.

=== Limited Edition ===
There is also a rare limited edition with blue LED lighting that came in a purple aluminum case. This version also has the USB interface. It has the regular Moog logo on the back panel and shipped in a custom flight case with the Moog logo on the case. This was a limited run of 100 units.

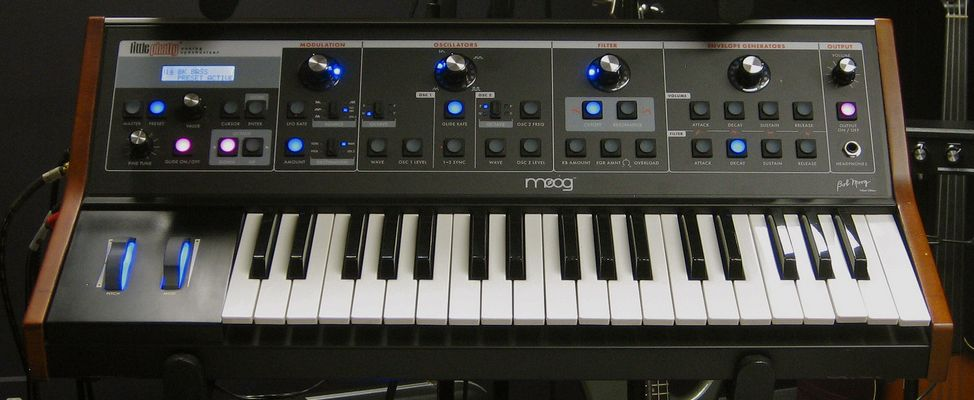
Little Phatty Tribute Edition (2006)

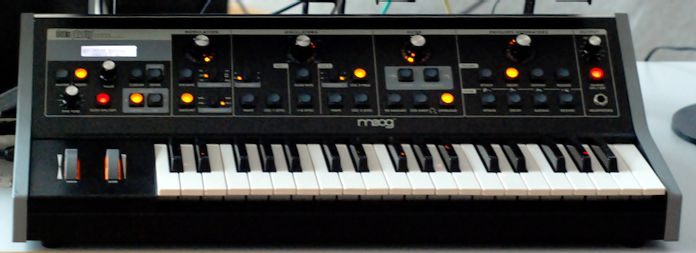
Little Phatty Stage Edition (2006-)
