= Moogerfooger =

Analogue effects pedals

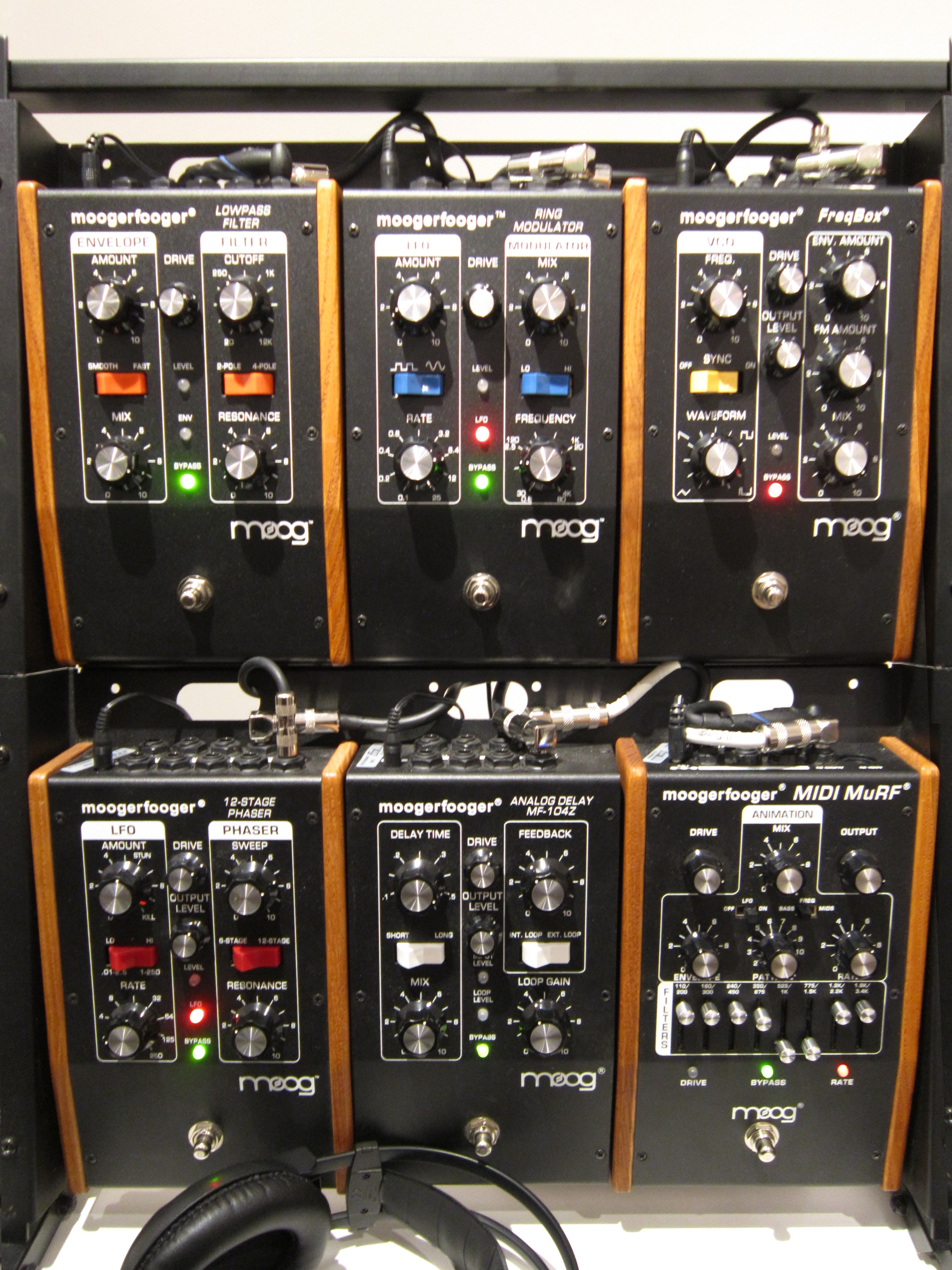
Several Moogerfoogers pedals.

Moogerfooger is the trademark for a series of analog effects pedals manufactured by Moog Music. There are currently eight different pedals produced; however, one of these models is designed for processing control voltages rather than audio signal. A sixth model, the Analog Delay, was released in a limited edition of 1000 units and has become a collector's item. Moog Music announced on August 28, 2018, that the Moogerfooger, CP-251, Minifooger, Voyager synthesizers, and some other product lines were being built using the remaining parts on hand and discontinued thereafter.

Audio moogerfoogers consist of a black wedge-shaped box, approximately 5 by 9 inches (13 by 23 cm), with walnut edges. The face contains an array of knobs, switches and LEDs. There is also a foot switch that allows the user to toggle the effect on and off and a knob that controls the gain. True to the nature of modular synthesizers, all parameters on the pedals are variable using control voltages which may be plugged into the rear of the pedal using 1/4" jacks.

== MF-101 ==
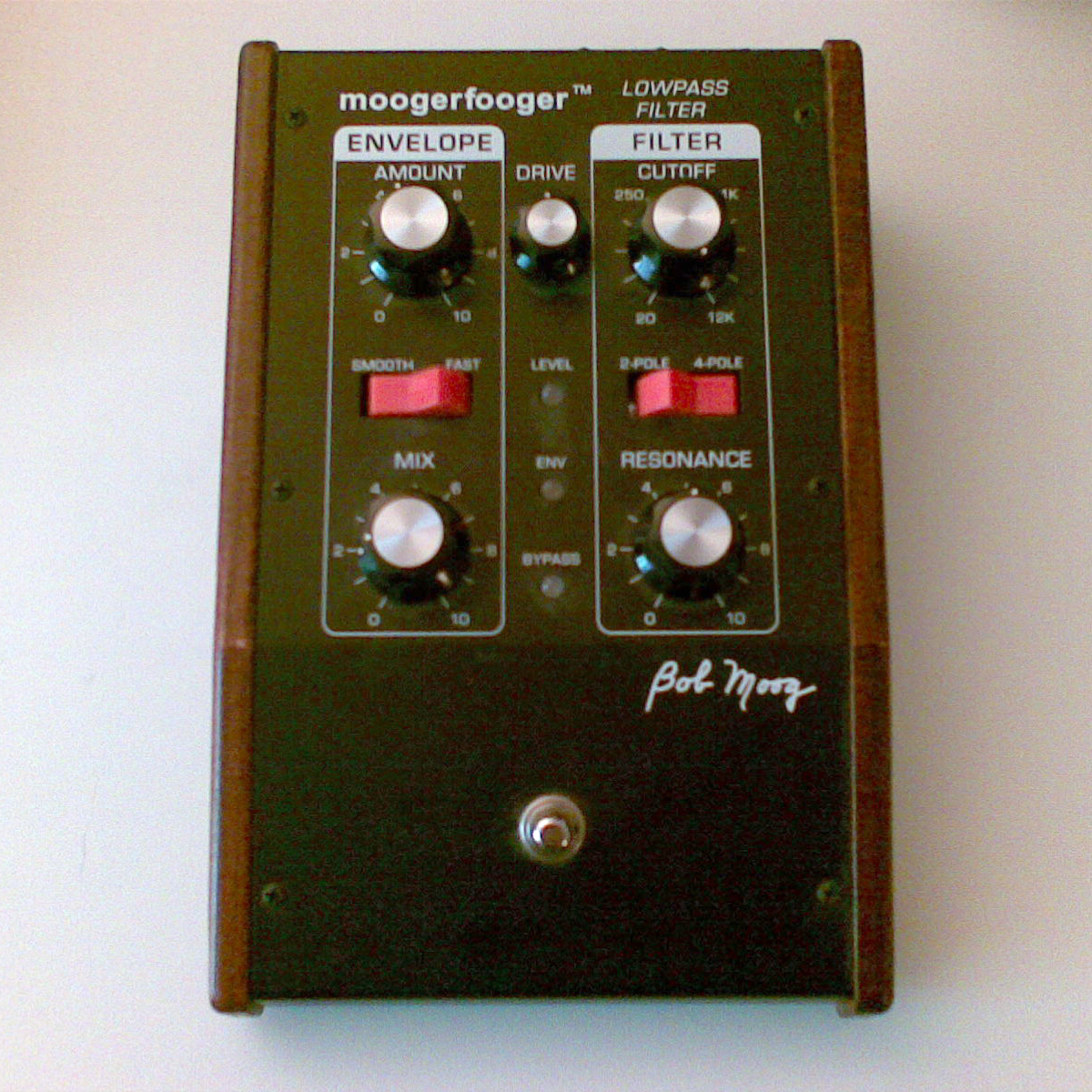
moogerfooger MF-101 Lowpass Filter

The MF-101 is an independent analog low-pass filter. Based on the amplitude of the dry audio signal, an envelope is generated. This envelope alters the filter's cutoff frequency and its amount is variable. Knobs also allow controlling of the filter's frequency (from 20 Hz to 12 kHz) and resonance. The resonance can be increased to the point of self-feedback producing a pitch that follows the filter cutoff frequency. The MF-101 was released by Big Briar (now Moog Music) in 1998.

== MF-102 ==
The MF-102 is an analog ring modulator. This moogerfooger heterodynes the dry audio signal with a carrier wave that is generated by an internal oscillator. The user can vary the frequency of the carrier oscillator from 0.6 Hz to 80 Hz on the Lo setting and from 30 Hz to 4 kHz on the Hi setting. The MF-102 also features an independent low frequency oscillator (LFO) that changes the frequency of the carrier oscillator. The user can select between two LFO waveshapes, either a square or sine-like (really a triangle) wave. The frequency range of the LFO was continuously variable from 0.1 Hz (one cycle every ten seconds) to 25 Hz. The user can also vary the amount, if any at all, which the LFO affects the carrier frequency. Like the MF-101, the MF-102 was released in 1998.

== MF-103 ==
The MF-103 is an analog twelve stage phaser. The user can control the "sweep" which moves the phaser's frequency response, yielding the classic phaser "whooshing" sound. The user can switch to 6-stage mode to produce a subtle change in harmonic response. The user can also control the phaser's resonance, changing the height and sharpness of the phaser's frequency response peaks. Like the MF-102, the MF-103 has an independent LFO, however in this instance it is used to vary the "sweep" parameter. In addition to a normal audio output, the MF-103 had 2nd Auxiliary output that was fed by an inverted instance of the Phase shifted signal. By utilizing both outputs in Stereo, some parts of the sound spectrum would be coming from one speaker and other parts would be coming from the other speaker. As the LFO modulates the phaser, the sound takes on a swirling spatial effect. The MF-103 was released in 1999.

== MF-104 ==
The MF-104 is a completely analog delay. The effect allows the musician a delay time between 40 milliseconds and .8 seconds. However the most remarkable feature is the use of an internal/external feedback loop. The feedback loop from the MF-104 can be routed through another effects processor and back into the delay unit, allowing processing of the echos as they are being generated. As with most analog delay processors, a desirable warmth of sound is created by the increasing natural decay of the original audio signal through the continuation of echoes.

Released in 2000, the MF-104 was manufactured in a limited edition of 1000 units. A special "bucket brigade delay chip" was employed to allow the effect to be completely analog; however, the supply of these chips was limited. The final units were sold in 2001 and the MF-104 Analog Delay remains the most sought-after of the moogerfoogers. In 2005, Moog Music announced the planned re-release of the MF-104, dubbed the MF-104Z. The new pedal will have the same functions as the original, but will feature a longer possible delay time (slightly longer than 1 second). At the same time, the MF-104SD was released in a limited edition of 250 units. The MF-104SD had a maximum delay time of 1.4 seconds, slightly longer than the MF-104Z.

In June 2012, Moog Music Inc. released the fourth and final version of their Moogerfooger Analog Delay, the MF-104M. The new MF-104M Analog Delay utilizes the same vintage Bucket Brigade chips found in the Classic MF-104. In addition, the MF-104M includes a number of customer requested feature and function upgrades. “We’re very excited about this limited release of the MF-104M,” said Moog Music CEO, Mike Adams. “Many of the parts we use to create these amazing delays are completely original and incredibly hard to find. Since this will be the last of its kind, we have gone to great lengths to incorporate features and functions requested by customers over the last 12 years. The MF-104M delivers those rich, creamy, classic delays Moog is renowned for, but also has the ability to modulate the delay time and create effects not found in any other analog delay."

The MF-104M recreates the sound of the original MF-104. It uses 4 MN3008s, which provide 800ms of analog delay. A new 6 Waveshape LFO significantly expands the sonic capabilities of this Classic Analog Delay. The MF-104M incorporates Spillover Mode, the most popular modification to the Classic MF-104. A Tap Tempo switch lets users quickly tap in delay times or LFO rates, and MIDI capability allows control over every function. The rear panel contains ports for additional pedal inputs, to control other parameters. Following their August 2018 discontinuation, Moog Music have made limited reissues available of their MF-104M pedals from time to time as they gather and acquire batches of MN3008 chips.

Moog Music did release yet another version of the MF-104 called the MF-104MSD which stood for Super Delay. These also had the same modulation features as the 104-M, including the same MIDI control, Tap Tempo, Spillover Mode but like the 104Z they were capable of producing delay times of 1200ms (1.2 seconds). Only 560 MF-104M Super Delays were produced and made available worldwide. An additional very small production run of about 30 units were built for the Gearfest trade show. These had the words 'Super Delay Small Batch' hand-written on the Black painted metal casing rather than the standard silk screened White paint.

== MF-105 ==
Better known as the MuRF, the MF-105 or Multiple Resonance Filter Array is an original effects processor, designed by Bob Moog in 2004. The MuRF has 8 band-pass filters whose levels are controlled by 8 sliders which resemble a Graphic Equalizer. The filters' center frequencies are set at 200 Hz, 300 Hz, 450 Hz, 675 Hz, 1 kHz, 1.5 kHz, 2.2 kHz and 3.4 kHz and their sliders adjust the gain of each filter. The Bass MuRF or MF-105B, designed for bass guitar players, has slightly lower center frequencies of 110 Hz, 160 Hz, 240 Hz, 350 Hz, 525 Hz, 775 Hz, 1.2 kHz and 1.8 kHz. In addition, the 110 Hz filter was changed to a low-pass filter.

The gain of each filter is further controlled by an envelope that is triggered by any of a number of preset animation sequences. The user can select one of 24 animation patterns. Rhythmic variations can be created by adjusting the levels of the filters, speed of animation, and envelope amount.

Moog Music upgraded the MF-105 by combining the two units into one box where the user could switch between having the 8 resonant filter sliders to operate either in the range of the MF-105B or the MF-105. This new version also had MIDI control and was released as the MF-105M MIDI MuRF. The unit has two outputs for either Mono or Stereo operation. When both the left and right output jacks are used, the odd-numbered filters are sent to the left channel, and the even-numbered filters are sent to the right channel. This allows for the spreading of a sound's frequencies between two speakers.

Moog also released Pattern editing software for the MF-105 which users can run on their home computers to create their own Animations that could be loaded into the unit. The MIDI MuRF Pattern Editor is available for download free of charge from Moog Music. It provides easy access to parameters only available through MIDI CC commands. Saving and storing patterns on a computer allows for an unlimited number of available pattern variations.

== MF-107 ==
The FreqBox or MF-107 was added to the moogerfooger series in early 2007. It was not designed by Bob Moog and it was the first new stomp box to be produced by Moog Music after Bob Moog's death. In general the FreqBox sounds similar to a synthesizer because its interior is actually a VCO that is modified by the input signal.

The left hand side of the control panel for the FreqBox contains a VCO which has two knobs to control frequency and waveshape. The waveshape is continuously variable from triangle wave to sawtooth wave to square wave to pulse wave. There is a hard sync on/off switch that turns on hard syncing the VCO signal with the input signals frequency. The amplitude of the VCO is controlled by the amplitude of the input signal.

On the right hand side there are three knobs. A mix knob to mix the level of input signal with the level of the VCO signal, an FM Amount knob that allows the input signal to modulate the VCO with frequency modulation, and an Env. Amount knob that sets an envelope to the frequency modulation.

== MF-108M ==
June 15, 2011 Moog Music announced the release of the Cluster Flux which was a signal processor that produced flanging and chorusing effects. It had a six-waveform modulation section, a knob that added either positive or negative feedback, a jack for inserting effects into the Feedback Loop, a Tap Tempo switch, a 5 Pin DIN input for MIDI Control and dual outputs for either Mono or Stereo. The Second output had a dip switch configurable for either Stereo out (two types), Delay only out, or dual Mono out.

== CP-251 ==
The CP-251 is a control voltage processor that is designed to be used with any of the moogerfoogers or any other audio device that can be manipulated with control voltages. It does not process sound, only the voltages that control the various parameters on other audio equipment. The control voltages act as invisible hands which "turn" the knobs and controls on the other gear. The CP-251 has a total of 9 knobs and 24 quarter-inch jacks.

The original CP-251 used red socket nuts to indicate connections providing a voltage for external pedal control (via the ring contact). Later versions had black nuts with white rings painted on the panel.

The CP-251 features an LFO with adjustable rate and square and triangle outputs, a lag processor that can alter the rise and fall of a signal, a multiple jack that passively joins four patchcords together, a white noise generator, two attenuators, a four-way mixer that can combine four signals into one, and a sample and hold. The sample and hold samples a voltage (the noise source) every time a trigger voltage (the square LFO) crosses the threshold. The sampled voltage appears in the output. The user can also use alternate sample and/or trigger voltages to produce desired effects.

The later version replaced the two simple attenuators (scaled 10-0) with 'attenuverters' (scaled -5, 0, +5) which added the ability to invert the control voltage polarity as well as attenuate the amplitude.

== Whitewashed Editions ==
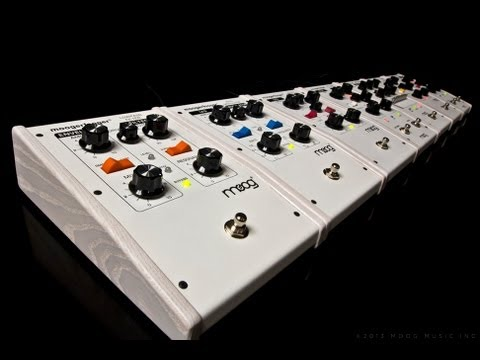

November 14, 2012 Moog Music released for a limited amount of time special order White-on-White versions of all the currently available Moogerfoogers which included the MF-101 Lowpass Filter, the MF-102 Ring Modulator, the MF-103 12 Stage Phaser, the MF-104M Analog Delay, the MF-105M MIDI MuRF, the MF-107 FreqBox and the MF-108M Cluster Flux. In comparison to the usual motif of Black painted cases with White lettering for front and rear panel graphics and stain finished wood side panels, these were in striking direct contrast, with White painted cases, Black lettering and graphics and "White-washed" wood side panels that were not completely painted over but just enough so that you could still see the wood grain show through. These units were sometimes referred to as the "Lunar Whitewash Editions" because of their characteristic appearance being somewhat similar to that of the spacecraft that NASA used for their Lunar excursions.

== April Fools' models ==
=== The 4'33" ===
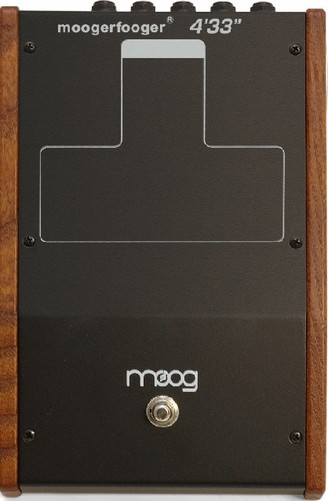
Moogerfooger 4'33ʺ

In late March 2005 Moog Music's website announced a new moogerfooger as an April Fool's Day joke. The moogerfooger 4'33" supposedly had only one button, which would silence any inputs for exactly 4 minutes and 33 seconds. The name and function of the unit was a reference to John Cage's famous composition 4′33″.

=== The MF / FM ===
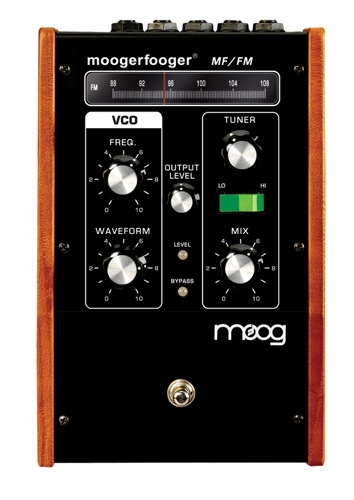
Moogerfooger MF FM

In late March 2007 Gizmodo.com ran an article announcing the Moogerfooger MF/FM. Pictured was an effect pedal modeled after the classic Moogerfooger design with a linear FM Tuner and a Green rocker switch. The device supposedly was able to lock into FM radio frequencies to create sounds weirder than ever before. The April 1 availability date was a giveaway that this was just another April Fool's Day joke. In theory however, if the device did exist it could have operated as described. Aleatory or chance operations were tools that 20th Century Music composers would use in their pieces to introduce random elements or "found objects" into performances of their works. Radio broadcasts in particular were largely unpredictable, plus they added elements of noise, static and different signals fading in and out as you would tune into different stations that would be used as texture in these pieces. The joke alludes to works by composers like Karlheinz Stockhausen, whose compositions Kurzwellen and Hymnen incorporate sounds from Short Wave Radio broadcasts. In popular music The Beatles used a live radio broadcast in their song “I Am The Walrus”, and Pink Floyd's “Wish You Were Here” opened with randomly changing the tuner frequency through live broadcasts on David Gilmour's car radio, which the songs opening bars were then also transmitted to, to complete the effect.

=== MF-106TC ===
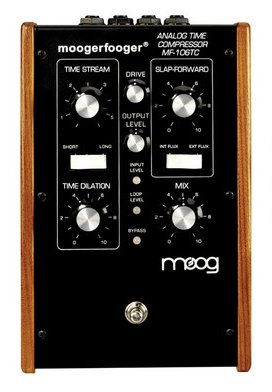
Moogerfooger MF-106 Time Compressor

On April 1, 2009, Moog Music's website announced another new moogerfooger as an April Fool's Day joke. The MF-106TC Analog Time Compressor supposedly had the ability to compress the time stream rather than expanding it like a delay pedal, which would then give musicians the ability to hear notes before they actually played them.

According to Amos Gaynes of Moog Music, given the possible fictitious title of Temporal Engineer, this was discovered when they accidentally reversed the clock phasing in the time generation on the MF-104Z Analog Delay, and discovered that it can actually work in reverse, compressing the time stream instead of expanding it. According to Moog, however, in a Consumer Product Safety Warning, customers should not attempt to reverse the clock phasing of the time generation circuit on their MF-104Z Delay to mimic the capabilities of the MF-106TC Analog Time Compressor, because without the factory-installed flux capacitor added, a standard MF-104Z will be seriously damaged.

== Software plugins ==
In 2000, digital effects recording studio Bomb Factory worked with Bob Moog to develop music plugins for Pro Tools based on the MF-101, MF-102, MF-103 and MF-104. The plugins allowed the user to replicate the effects of the moogerfoogers while editing or processing digital audio on their computer.

In 2022, Moog Music developed new audio plugins based on seven of the moogerfoogers: MF-101, MF-102, MF-103, MF-104, MF-105, MF-107 and MF-108. The plugins were released as AAX, VST3, and AU for DAWs on Windows and Mac. In addition to replicating the effects, they included digital CV so moogerfooger plug-ins could be connected to each other like the original hardware.
