= Moog Music =

American synthesizer manufacturer

Moog Music Inc.

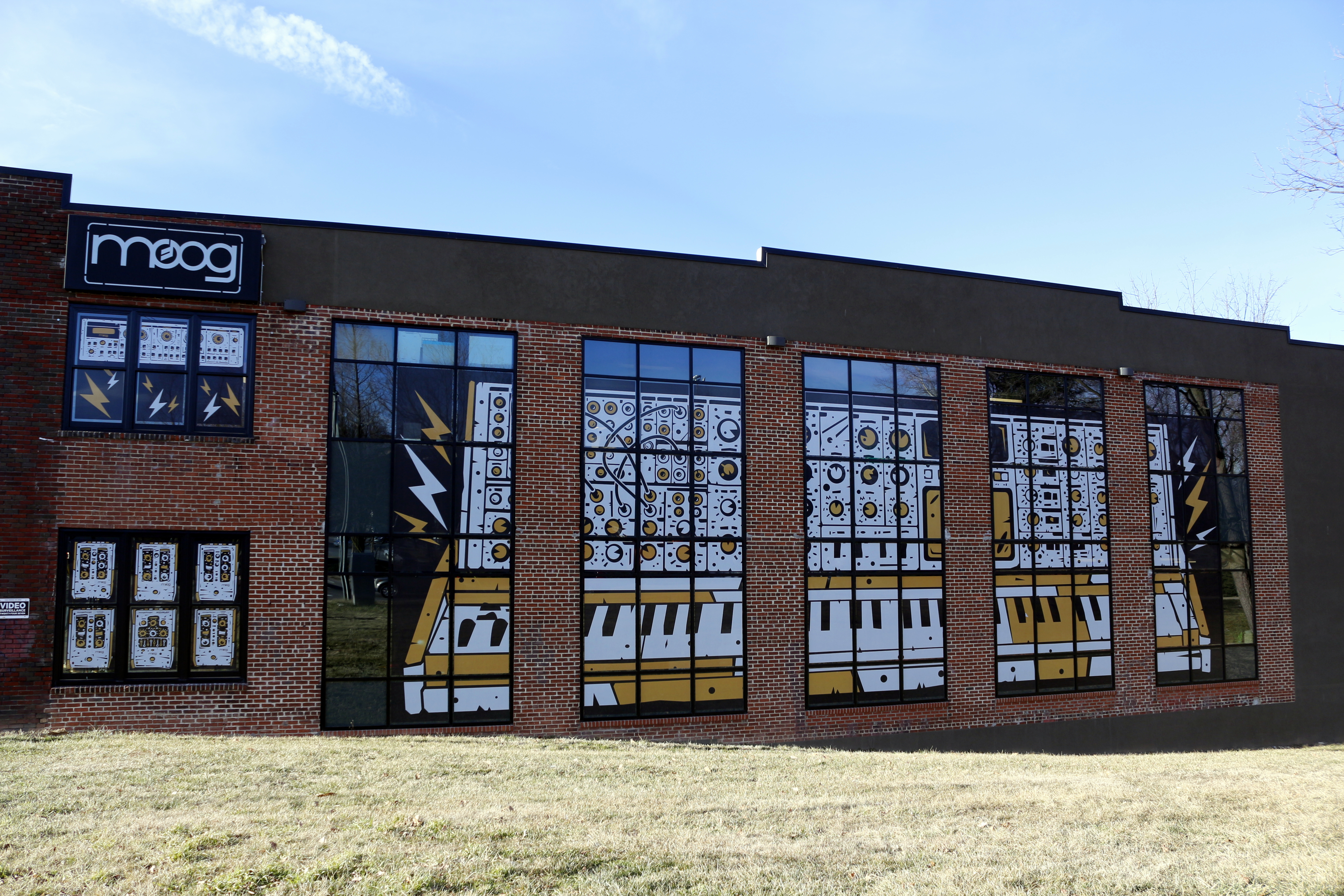
- Exterior of Moog Music building in Asheville, North Carolina
- Formerly: R. A. Moog Co. (1953-1972)
- Type: Subsidiary
- Founded: 1953; 73 years ago Trumansburg, New York, U.S.
- Headquarters: Asheville, North Carolina, U.S.
- Key people: Robert Moog, founder Mike Adams, president
- Products: Synthesizers, Musical instruments, Signal processing
- Parent: inMusic
- Website: www.moogmusic.com

Moog Music Inc. (/moʊɡ/ MOHG) is an American synthesizer company based in Asheville, North Carolina. It was founded in 1953 as R. A. Moog Co. by Robert Moog and his father and was renamed Moog Music in 1972. Its early instruments included the Moog synthesizer (the first commercial synthesizer), followed by the Minimoog in 1970, both of which were highly influential electronic instruments.

In 1973, following a recession, Robert Moog sold Moog Music to Norlin Musical Instruments, where he remained employed as a designer until 1977. In 1978, he founded a new company, Big Briar. Moog Music filed for bankruptcy in 1987 and the Moog Music trademark was returned to Robert Moog in 2002, when Big Briar resumed operations under the name Moog Music. In June 2023, Moog Music was acquired by inMusic.

Moog Music also managed Moogfest, an electronic music and music technology festival in Durham, North Carolina.

== Connection with Moog Inc. ==
Moog Music is often confused with Moog Inc., partly because they were both founded at approximately the same time by cousins. In April 1950 Bill Moog (cousin of Robert Moog, inventor of the Moog synthesizer) applied for a patent for the electrohydraulic servo valve (later called a "Moog Valve"), a device to control hydraulic pressure for fine control of actuators. The US patent 2625136 was issued in January 1953. The company he founded subsequently became Moog Inc., now a major international defense and aerospace manufacturer.

== History ==
=== 1953–1971: R. A. Moog, theremins, and Moog synthesizer ===
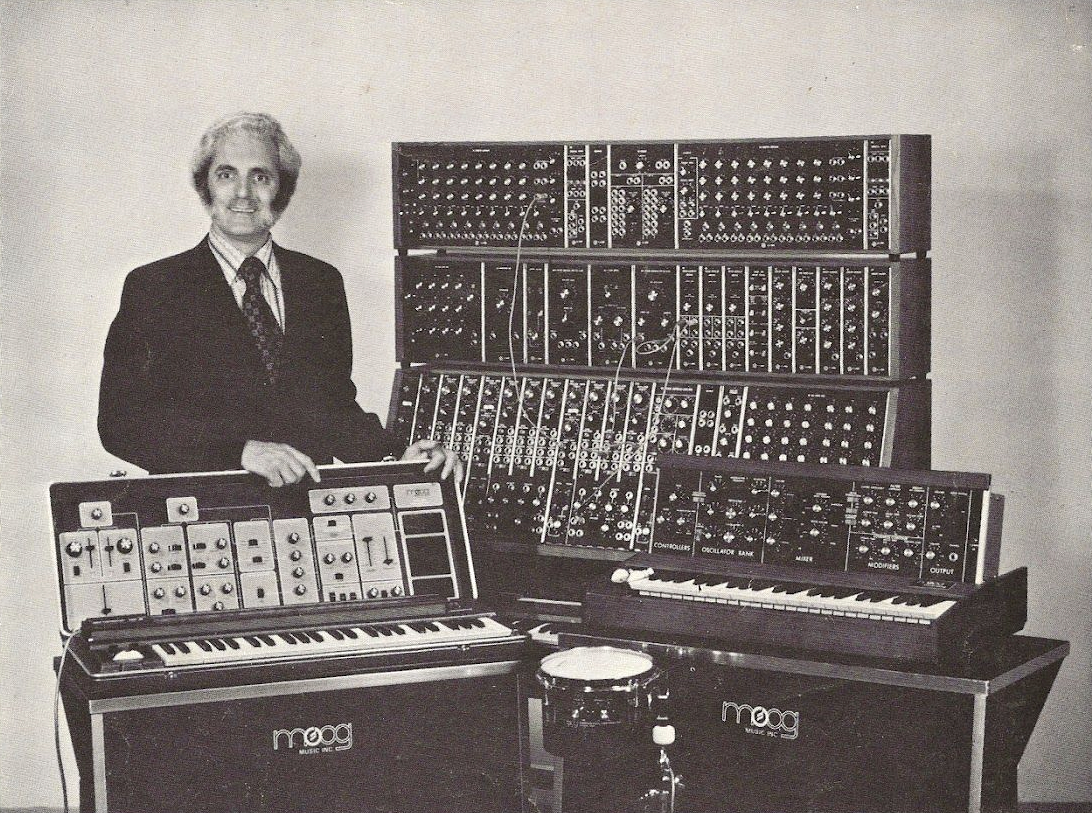
Robert Moog with a variety of his own synthesizers

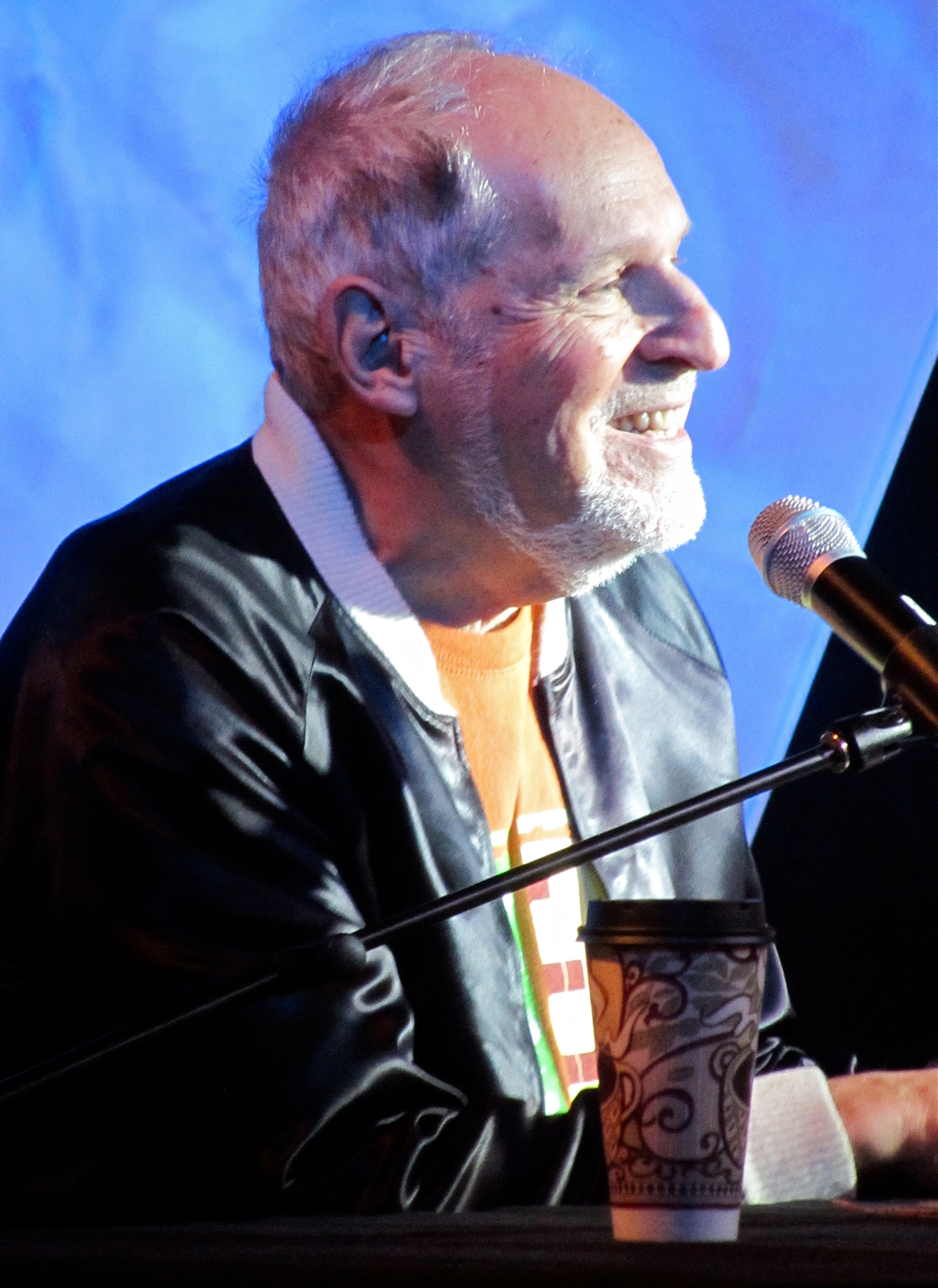
Herbert Deutsch, collaborator and friend of Robert Moog

Robert Moog founded R. A. Moog Co. with his father in 1953 at the age of 19, building and selling theremin kits and theremins by mail order first from his parents' home in the Flushing neighborhood of Queens in New York City and, after he married, in his own home in Ithaca, before establishing the company's first commercial space at 41 East Main Street in Trumansburg, New York in 1963.

In 1963, Moog met experimental composer Herbert Deutsch at a music education conference in Rochester, New York, after Deutsch had built a theremin following Moog's design. With assistance and suggestions from Deutsch and other musicians, Moog built the Moog synthesizer, the first voltage-controlled synthesizer utilizing a keyboard.

By 1967, R. A. Moog, Co. had become a larger enterprise, continuing to sell theremin kits but with sales mainly focused on sales of the large modular Moog synthesizer systems. Though the sound of the Moog synthesizer had rapidly become iconic with the success of Wendy Carlos's Switched-On Bach, the instrument's market was limited by its size, impracticality, and price. The company ran deep into debt, turning a profit only one year of its existence – 1969, following the 'Switched-On' sensation ignited by Carlos.

=== 1971–1977: Moog Musonics, Moog Music, Inc., changes of management, and financial duress ===
In November 1971, rival company muSonics bought R. A. Moog, Inc. and relocated the company to Williamsville, New York. An old factory at the north end of Academy Street was purchased. The company was renamed Moog Musonics, then Moog Music, Inc.

In 1972, former televangelist and successful salesman David VanKouvering joined the company as VP of Marketing, creating a network of retail stores throughout the United States and then the entire world. Despite the increased commercial success the company saw with the introduction of the Minimoog, competition with ARP Instruments, Oberheim Electronics, and Electronic Music Studios drove the company steadily deeper into debt. and Moog Music, Inc. was sold to Norlin Industries in 1973. At this point, rival companies such as the aforementioned ARP Instruments were producing both monophonic and polyphonic synthesizers that rapidly outpaced the Moog in popularity. By 1975, ARP owned 40% of the synthesizer market share, effectively boxing out Moog Music, Inc.

In 1976, Norlin moved the company to a facility on Walden Avenue in Cheektowaga. In 1977, once his contract with Norlin expired, Robert Moog officially left the company to pursue his own ventures, founding the firm Big Briar.

=== 1978–1987: Contract manufacturing, digital synthesis, and bankruptcy ===
By 1978, Moog Music, Inc. had released a number of products after the success of the Minimoog, including the Vocoder, the Micromoog, Multimoog, the Polymoog, and a series of Taurus bass pedals. Despite numerous artists taking up these products, none of these synthesizers ever achieved the same success. That same year, Sequential Circuits released its groundbreaking Prophet-5 which became a new industry standard, and further eroded Moog's market share. The company's problems were compounded by competition from Japanese manufacturers such as Roland, Korg and Yamaha, who by the late 1970s and early 1980s, were producing analog synthesizers of comparable ability but at a lower price point.

The company began contract manufacturing in 1981 in various other industries, including subway system repairs and air conditioning systems.

Around the same time, digital synthesis was becoming a viable alternative to analog synthesizers. The Fairlight CMI, released 1979, was an expensive though fully formed digital synthesizer and sampler; in 1983, the introduction of the MIDI interface allowed rival Yamaha to release the world's first commercially successful digital synthesizer, the DX7. Moog Music attempted to pivot to produce digital synthesizers, but declared bankruptcy in 1987.

=== 2000–2005: Legal battle, return to Robert Moog and analog revival ===
As digital synthesizers rapidly became ubiquitous, the 1990s saw a rise in nostalgia for the iconic analog sound of Moog and Minimoog synthesizers, with musicians like David Foster continuing to use them. Minimoogs began fetching high prices as collector's items. In 1994, the Moog Music trademark expired and was purchased by Don Martin; a legal battle ensued in 2000 over ownership of the name, and it was returned to Robert Moog in 2002.

Moog Music moved to Asheville, North Carolina, and continued its development of products created under Robert Moog's former company Big Briar, such as the Moogerfooger pedals and theremins, as well as introducing numerous new products such as the Minimoog Voyager, Little Phatty, Sub 37, and Mother 32 some of which continue to be produced and sold today. The company has seen fiscal growth and increased interest due in part to the analog revival, evidenced by the introduction of so many new analog synthesizers being released by companies such as Moog, Korg, Arturia, and Dave Smith Instruments, that has continued climbing to reach a high point in the 2010s.

=== 2005–present: Death of Robert Moog and transition to employee ownership ===
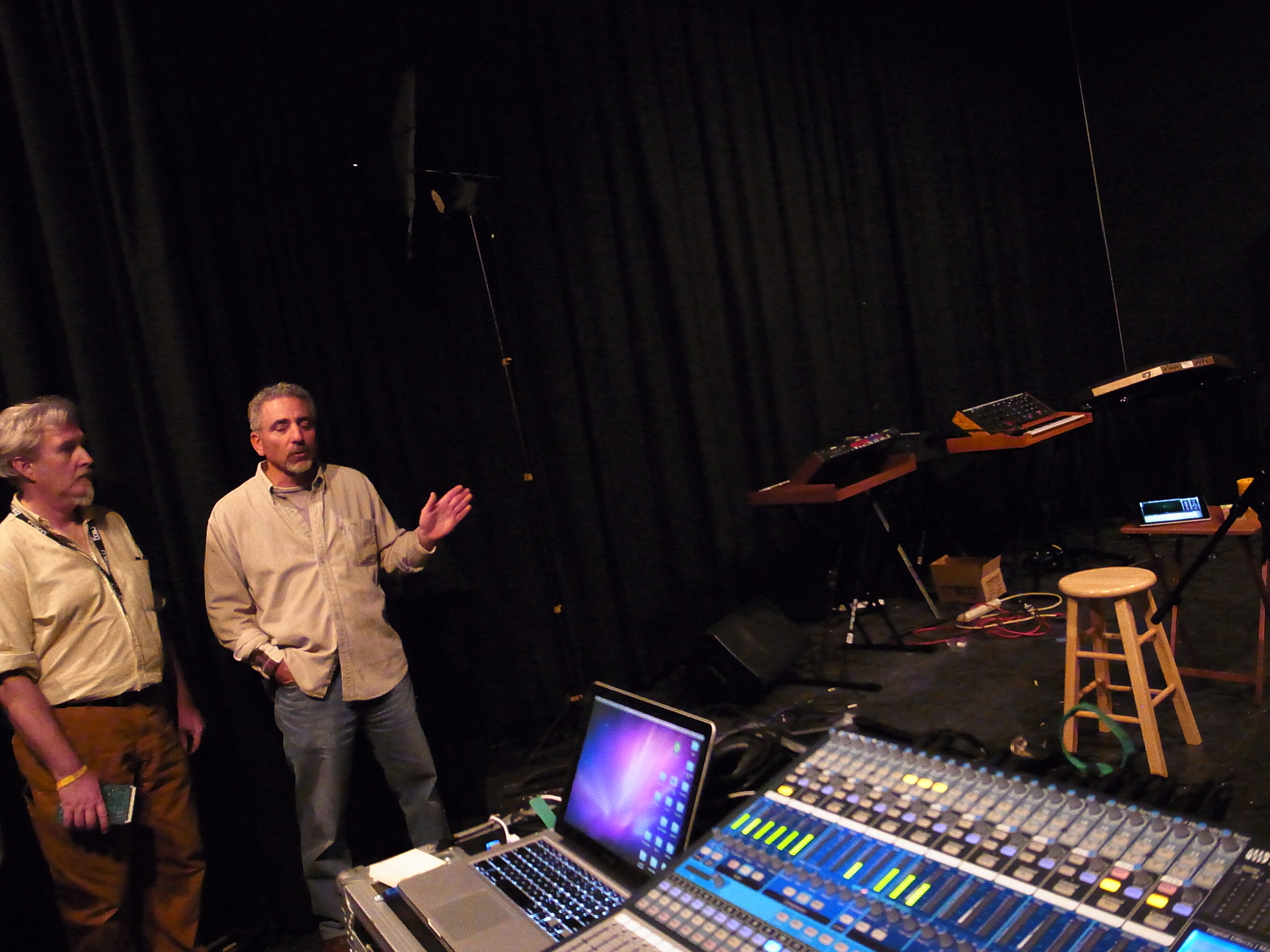
Mike Adams, former Moog Music, Inc. CEO pictured on the right

After Robert Moog died in 2005 due to complications arising from brain cancer, his collaborator Michael Adams took over the company as president. The company moved into a former Buick dealership on Broadway Street in 2010. The company shifted to being partially employee owned, with its 62 employees owning 49% of the company's shares in 2015. The company has in recent years seen the results of a strong incentive to introduce new products to meet the demands generated by today's market and have also produced limited edition reissues of historic Moog synthesizers as well as reaching out into the emerging Eurorack synthesizer market with instruments such as semi-modular synthesizers, the Mother 32, DFAM, Grandmother, Matriarch and Subharmonicon.

On 1 June 2022, the employees, as Moog Workers Unite, launched a union drive with IBEW. In June 2023, Moog Music was acquired by inMusic. In September, more than half of the staff at the Asheville headquarters were laid off. Design, development and engineering moved from Broadway Street to the Asheville Citizen-Times building on O. Henry Street.

From 2011 to 2024, Moog sold its synthesizers at the Moog Store. The factory remained in operation and the Moogseum on Broadway Street in Asheville would continue to educate people on the company's history.

== Major products ==
=== Moog synthesizer (1964) ===
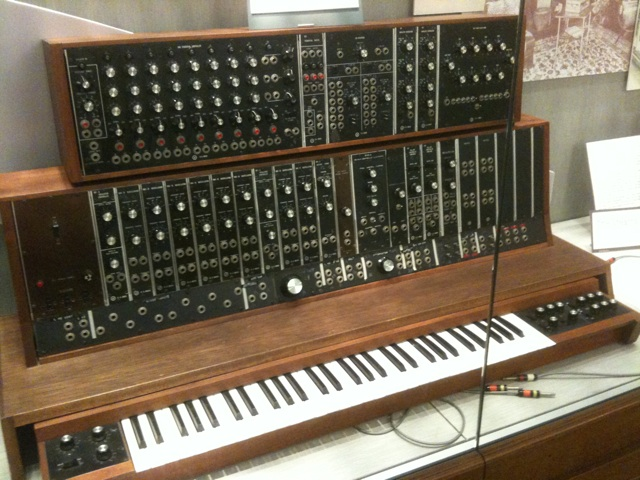
First commercial Moog synthesizer, constructed 1964

At the prompting of composer Herbert Deutsch, Moog invented the Moog synthesizer in 1964. Defined by its use of modules, or independent circuits that performed distinctive tasks – oscillators, filters, amplifiers, envelope generators – the Moog synthesizer allowed users to connect different modules in arbitrary configurations to create remarkably complex sounds. Famously, it also employed a keyboard interface, as opposed to contemporary synthesizer manufacturer Buchla Electronic Musical Instruments who chose to explore alternative control methods instead of using the immediately familiar piano-like interface.

Moog went on to present the synthesizer at the 1964 Audio Engineering Society conference, where it rapidly gained notoriety. The Moog saw some measure of success as experimental artists as Paul Beaver, Suzanne Ciani, and David Borden began to employ it in their work, and the rise of psychedelic rock in the 1960s saw numerous commercial artists employ the Moog in their music, including the Monkees, the Byrds, the Beatles, the Rolling Stones, and the Doors.

Perhaps the greatest commercial success for the Moog synthesizer arrived in 1968 with Wendy Carlos's seminal album Switched-On Bach selling over a million copies and winning three Grammy Awards. The success of that album prompted a brief fad of 'Switched-On' music that faded away by 1970.

=== Minimoog (1970) ===
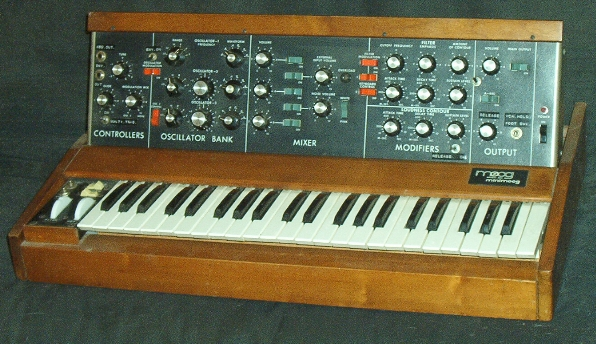
The Minimoog, introduced 1970

Despite the success of the Moog, its relatively large size made it impractical for general use. Together with engineers Jim Scott and Bill Hemsath, Moog built the Minimoog. The Minimoog employed the minimal number of modules possible and did away with patch cords, instead hardwiring the various modules together. Furthermore, the Minimoog introduced the pitch wheel, enabling vibrato and pitch-bending an interval of a perfect fifth above or below the note played on the keyboard. Its compact size and range of available sounds allowed the Minimoog to be a comparative success, selling over 13,000 units over the next decade. Following the Minimoog's appearance on 1972's chart-topping 'Fragile' by Yes and the debut of Rick Wakeman with the band, Pink Floyd, Stevie Wonder, Herbie Hancock, Chick Corea, Weather Report, Emerson, Lake & Palmer, Tangerine Dream, and other artists quickly embraced the Minimoog.

Other variations on the Minimoog theme continued to be produced but none achieved the same level of success, and the company decided to re-release an updated Minimoog in 2016.

=== Taurus (1975) ===
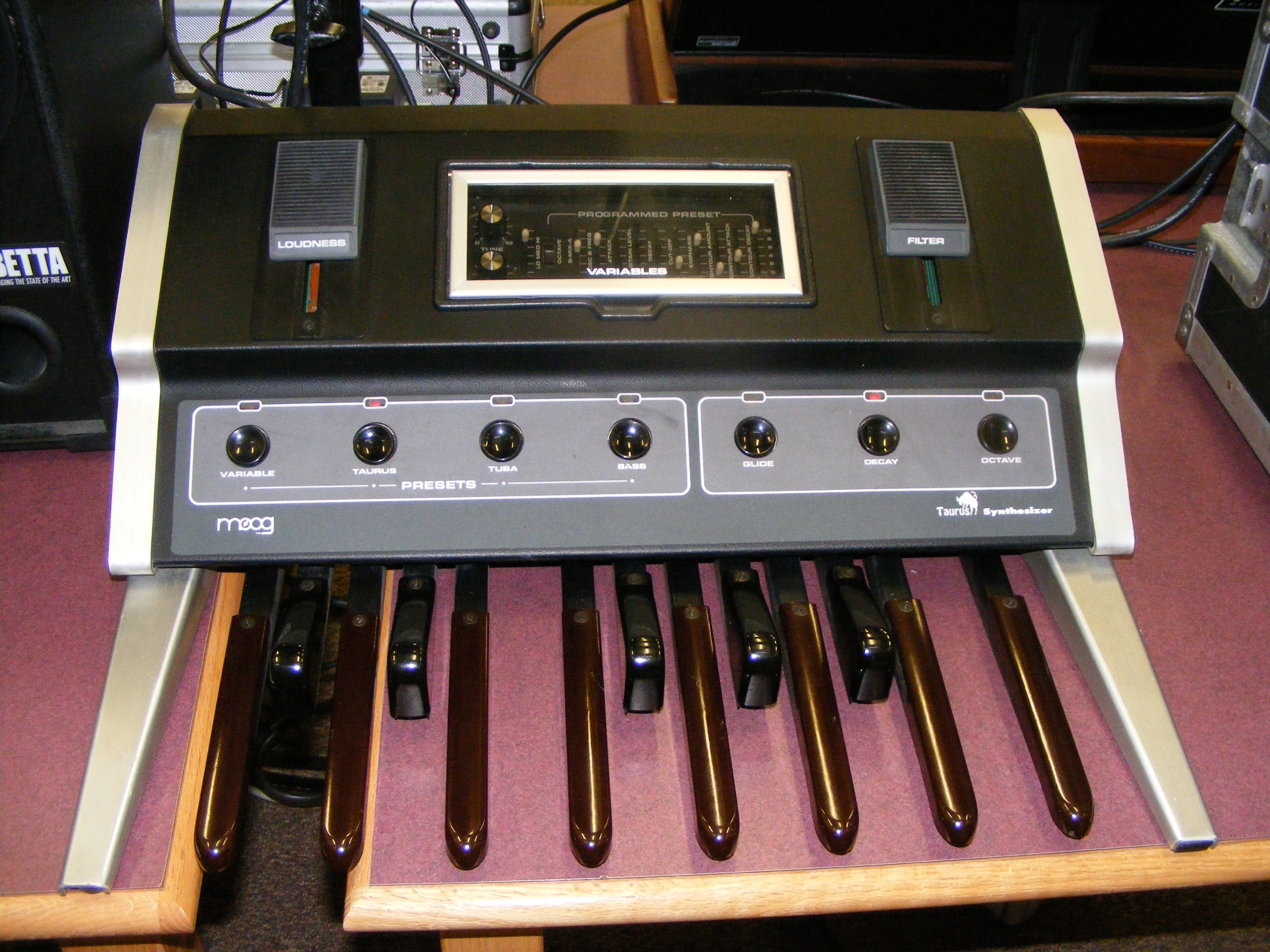
The Moog Taurus, with its organ-style pedals

The first true Moog bass instrument was the Moog Taurus, a pedal-operated analog synthesizer. Like the Moog, it remained a monophonic analog subtractive synthesizer, initially with 13 pedals in its first model. The Taurus II was expanded to include 18 pedals, and the Taurus III returned to 13.

The Taurus was picked up by various progressive rock bands, including Led Zeppelin, Rush, Yes, Genesis, and Dream Theater.

=== Vocoder (1978) ===
Though Moog had developed his own vocoder in 1968, Moog Music's commercial product was not released until 1978 and was based almost entirely on Harald Bode's design. Many other companies already were releasing their own vocoders, including Korg, Roland, Electronic Music Studios, and more. Its lack of support for MIDI has made it less enduringly popular than its counterparts.

=== Moogerfooger (1998) ===
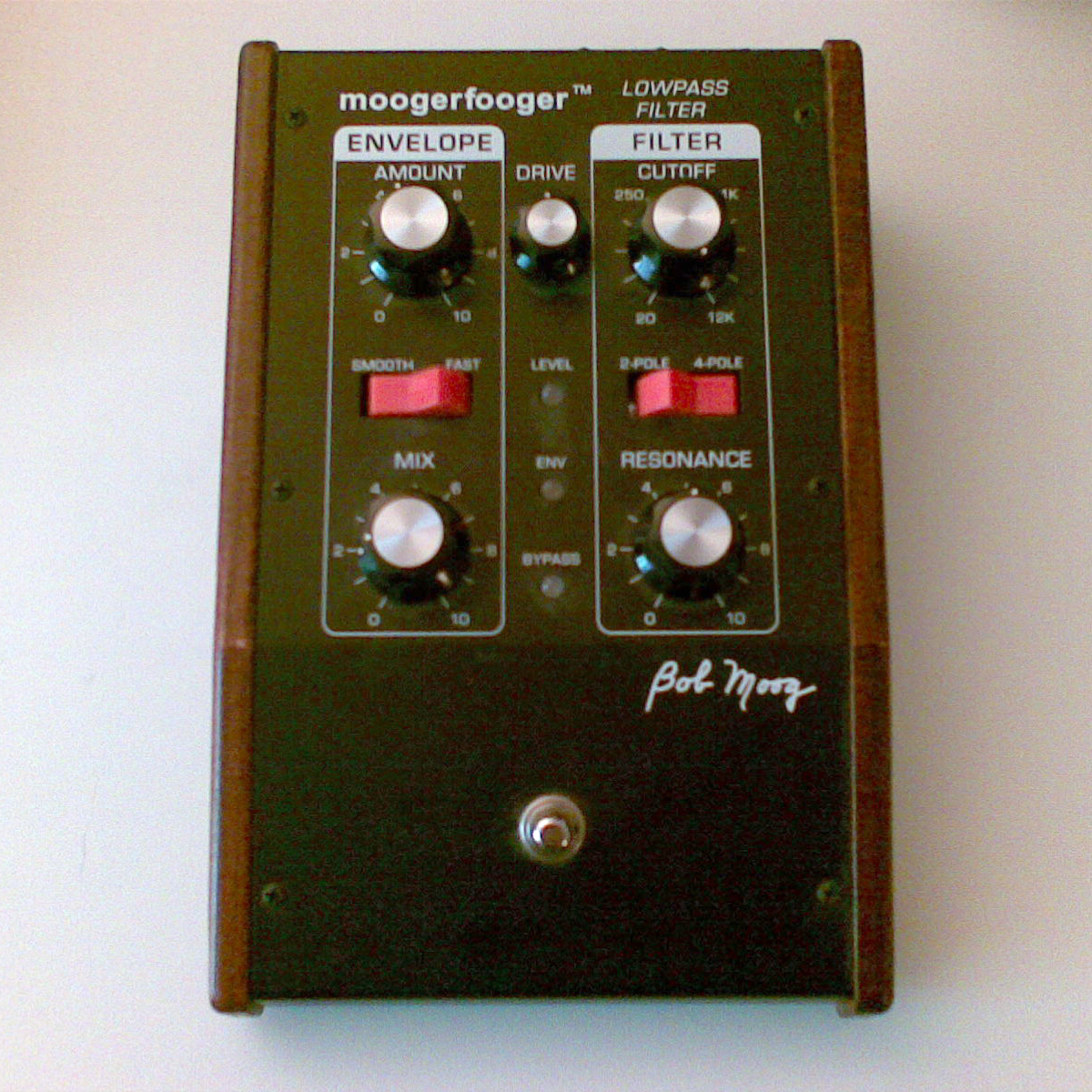
A Moogerfooger with low-pass filter functionality

The Moogerfooger, introduced under Big Briar, is an analog effects pedal that essentially allowed users to apply the modules that constituted the original Moog design to arbitrary sound inputs. Some of the effects included ring modulation, low-pass filtration, ladder filtration, and flanging. The Moogerfooger was successful, and saw a variety of models produced. It was discontinued in 2018, after 20 years of production.

=== Minimoog Voyager (2002) ===
In 2002, on reacquiring the Moog Music trademark, the company began to produce the Minimoog Voyager, effectively an updated version of the iconic Minimoog. The Voyager famously featured a true analog signal path from oscillators to output, but integrated digital controls that made storing presets, along with many other features, available to the Minimoog family.

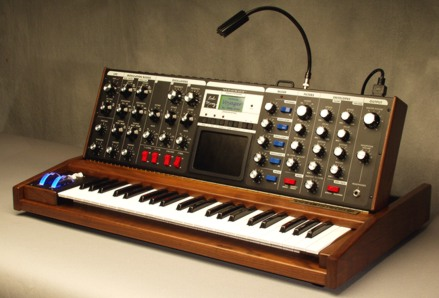
The Minimoog Voyager, an update on the classic Minimoog

=== Little Phatty (2006) ===
The Little Phatty, introduced in 2006, was Moog Music's answer to demand for a portable, affordable analog signal path synthesizer. It was the last instrument that Robert Moog participated in the design of and was released by the company shortly after Robert's death in 2005.

=== Sub Phatty (2013) ===
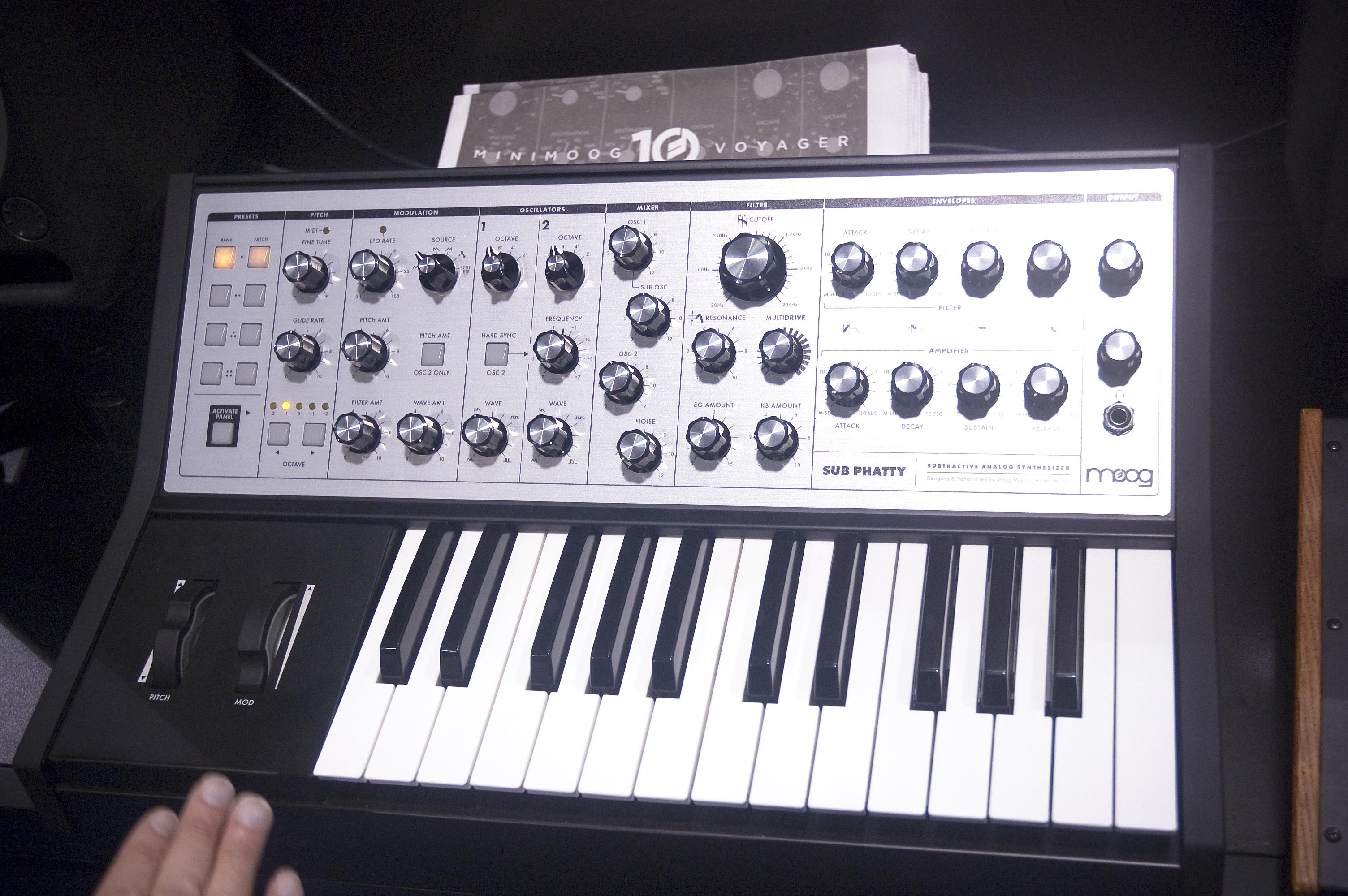
The Moog Sub Phatty, featuring an update on the Phatty series circuitry

With the release of the Sub Phatty in 2013, Moog Music introduced the first synthesizer with an entirely new circuitry schematic since Robert Moog's death in 2005. This new synthesizer featured a new oscillator design with an updated analog sound and increased panel dive edit-ability. This popularity of this instrument inspired multiple subsequent versions from the company with the release of the Sub 37 and Subsequent 37. These synthesizers introduced additional features such as a sequencer and brought edit-ability up from the dive format to the immediate accessibility of the front panel.

=== Mother-32 (2015) ===
Embracing renewed interest in modular synthesis and the ever growing Eurorack synthesizer standard's popularity, Moog Music introduced the Mother-32 as a Eurorack compatible synthesizer featuring Moog circuitry and sound. They have since released a number of modules as well as modular and semi-modular synthesizers.

=== DFAM (Drummer From Another Mother) (2018) ===
In 2017, Moog Music unveiled the DFAM at Moogfest as a successor to the Mother-32 series of Eurorack-friendly semi-modular synthesizers. DFAM is a percussive synthesizer with the ability to create "dirty and punchy" drum sounds.

=== Grandmother (2018) ===
Following in the footsteps of the early modular synthesizer reissues the company introduced in the 2010s and the Mother-32 and other Eurorack friendly options of the same decade, Moog Music introduced the semi-modular Moog Grandmother synthesizer, offering buyers of Moog instruments the freedom of modular patchability combined with the immediate accessibility of a fixed path synthesizer.

=== Matriarch (2019) ===
As a bigger brother to the Grandmother, Moog Music introduced the Matriarch in 2019. Adding a wider fatar keybed, more modules and patchpoints, and replacing the internal spring-reverb in Grandmother with an analog delay in the Matriarch

=== Subharmonicon (2020) ===
Continuing on the Mother ecosystem, Moog Music introduced the Subharmonicon, a Eurorack compatible semi-modular table-top synthesizer designed on the principles of subharmonics and polyrhythms.

=== Mavis (2022) ===
A semi-modular 44 hp monophonic synthesizer with an envelope generator, LFO, wave folder and filter bank, with a one octave rubber keyboard.

=== Spectravox (2024) ===
Extending the Mother line, the Spectravox integrates a sophisticated vocoder and filter bank, and can be used to create drones and colorful tonal sweeps.

=== Labyrinth (2024) ===
Extending the Mother line, the Labyrinth features two generative sequencers, a wavefolder, and a state-variable filter. Like the rest of the Mother line, it is a Eurorack compatible semi-modular table-top synthesizer.

=== Muse (2024) ===
An eight-voice bi-timbral analog machine with two oscillators, a mod oscillator, three low-frequency oscillators (LFOs), two filters, two envelopes, a digital delay, and aftertouch (though not polyphonic).

=== Messenger (2025) ===
Moog Music introduced the Messenger, a monophonic synthesizer.

== Moogfest ==
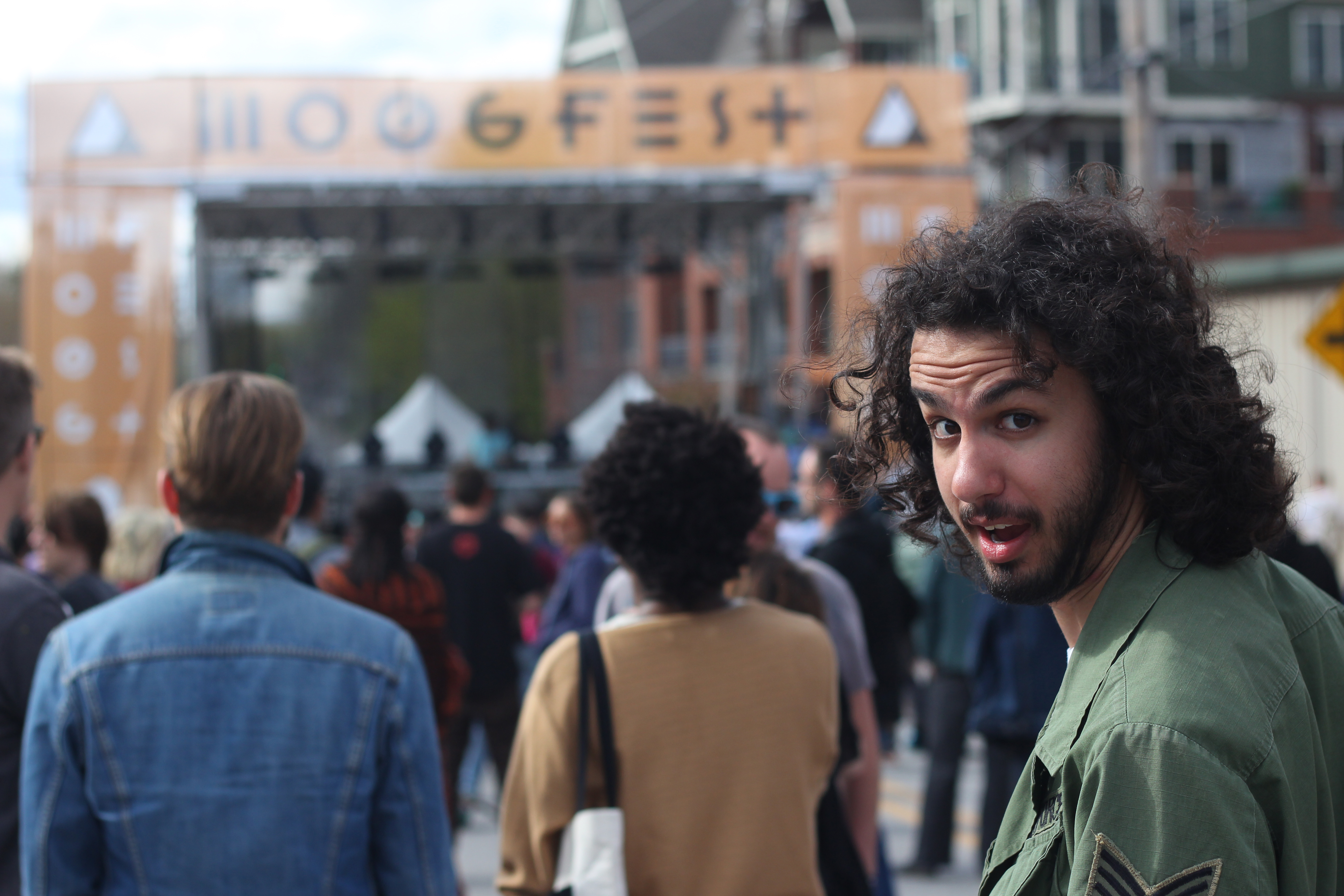
Participants in front of a Moogfest stage in 2014

Moogfest is the name of a festival first held in New York City in 2004 to honor the work of Moog founder Robert Moog, as well as electronic music and, eventually, technology and development. In 2010, the festival relocated to downtown Asheville, North Carolina where Moog Music was headquartered. In 2012, Moogfest ended its affiliation with AC Entertainment, eventually relocating to Durham, North Carolina due to an increased desire to bolster the tech and development arms of the festival, taking into consideration Durham's status as an up-and-coming tech center.

The festival attracted high-profile acts such as Keith Emerson, Laurie Anderson, Brian Eno, and Jónsi of Sigur Rós as well as numerous emerging and experimental groups and artists. Additionally, the festival featured workshops and presentations that focus on instrument development and building (for instance the Moog Werkstatt-Ø1 was initially offered as a festival-build activity), music tech, and research.

However, the festival and parent company Moog Music Inc. were the subject of several lawsuits, for complaints including breach of contract, non-payment, and fraud, including a 2019 lawsuit filed by Q Level LLC and another lawsuit filed in 2021 by Moogfest LLC and UG Strategies LLC, as well as a 2020 sexual discrimination lawsuit filed by a former employee.

== List of synthesizer models ==
- Moog modular synthesizer (1963–80, 2015–present)
- Minimoog (1970–81, 2016–2017, 2022–present)
- Moog Satellite (1974–79)
- Moog Sonic Six (1974–79)
- Minitmoog (1975–76)
- Micromoog (1975–79)
- Polymoog (1975–80)
- Moog Taurus (bass pedals) (1976–83)
- Multimoog (1978–81)
- Moog Prodigy (1979–84)
- Moog Liberation (1980–81)
- Moog Opus 3 (1980–83)
- Moog Concertmate MG-1 (1981–83)
- Moog Rogue (1981–83)
- Moog Source (1981–84)
- Memorymoog (1982–85)
- Moog SL-8 prototype (1983)
- Moogerfooger (1998–2018)
- Minimoog Voyager (2002–15)
- Moog Little Phatty (2006–13)
- Slim Phatty (2010–14)
- Taurus 3 bass pedal (2011)
- Minitaur (2012)
- Sub Phatty (2013)
- Sub 37 (2014)
- Moog Werkstatt-Ø1 (2014 kit, 2014 retail) limited kit for the 2014 Moogfest Engineering Workshop, retail release later that year
- Emerson Moog Modular (2014)
- Mother-32 (2015–present)
- Moog BFAM (Brother From Another Mother) (2016) limited kit for the 2017 Moogfest Engineering Workshop
- Subsequent 37 CV (2017) limited run of 2,000 units
- Subsequent 37 (2017–present)
- Moog DFAM (Drummer From Another Mother) (2017 kit, 2018–present) limited kit for the 2017 Moogfest Engineering Workshop, retail release in 2018
- Moog Subharmonicon (2018 kit, 2020–present) limited kit for the 2018 Moogfest Engineering Workshop, retail edition released in 2020
- Moog Grandmother (2018–present)
- Moog One (2018–present)
- Sirin: Analog Messenger of Joy (2019–present)
- Moog Spectravox (2019) limited kit for the 2019 Moogfest Engineering Workshop
- Moog Matriarch (2019–2026)
- Moog Mavis (2022-present)
- Moog Labyrinth (2024)
- Moog Muse (2024)
- Moog Messenger (2025)
