= Multimoog =

Monophonic analog synthesizer

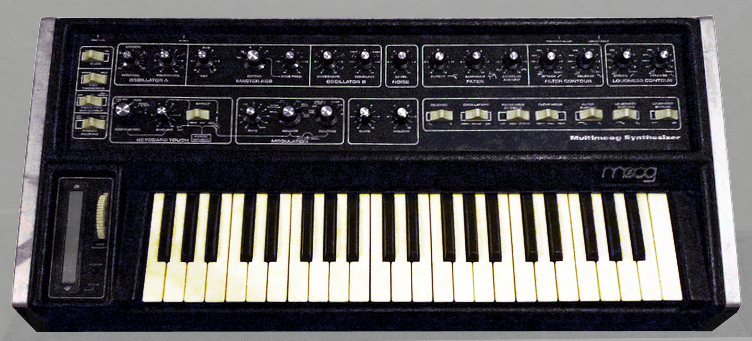
- Manufacturer: Moog Music
- Dates: 1978–1981

Technical specifications
- Polyphony: Monophonic
- Timbrality: Monotimbral
- Oscillator: 2
- LFO: 1 square/triangle/random (sample & hold), 0.5–30 Hz
- Synthesis type: Analog subtractive
- Filter: 1 low-pass, 24 dB/oct, 1 AR envelope
- Attenuator: 2 AD/AR envelopes
- Storage memory: none
- Effects: none

Input/output
- Keyboard: 44 keys
- Left-hand control: Ribbon controller mod wheel
- External control: CV/Gate

The Multimoog is a monophonic analog synthesizer manufactured by Moog Music from 1978 to 1981. Derived from the earlier Micromoog (internally, it consists of a stock Micromoog circuit board with the extra circuitry on a second board), the Multimoog was intended to be a less expensive alternative to the Minimoog. It nevertheless had some advanced features which the Minimoog did not—most notably, it was one of the earliest synthesizers to feature aftertouch capability.

Key features include:

- 44-note monophonic keyboard with aftertouch
- ribbon-type pitch-bend controller
- "glide" (portamento)
- 2 voltage-controlled oscillators with waveform continuously adjustable from sawtooth, through square to narrow pulse, plus sub-octave “doubling” on VCO B.
- oscillator sync
- noise source
- 24 dB/octave Moog transistor-ladder lowpass voltage-controlled filter
- dedicated low-frequency oscillator with triangle, square, and random waveforms
- extensive modulation routing options, including sample-and-hold, audio-frequency modulation of the VCF for quasi-ring modulation, waveform sweep/quasi-pulse-width modulation, and more
- 2 AR (attack/release) envelope generators with switchable percussive/sustaining profiles
- external audio input for processing instruments, vocals, etc.
- external control voltage and trigger inputs/outputs for interfacing with other synthesizer equipment

== See also ==
- Micromoog
- Memorymoog
- Minimoog
- Moog modular synthesizer
- Moog synthesizer
- Robert Moog
- Moog Music
- List of Moog synthesizer players
