= Moog Rogue =

Monophonic analogue synthesizer

Rogue
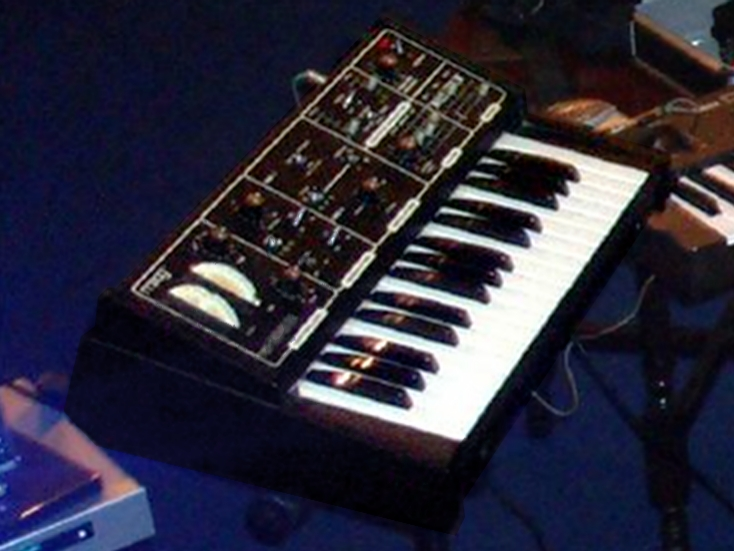
- Manufacturer: Moog Music
- Dates: 1981
- Price: $545

Technical specifications
- Polyphony: Monophonic
- Timbrality: Monotimbral
- Oscillator: 2
- LFO: 1
- Synthesis type: Analog subtractive
- Filter: low-pass
- Attenuator: ASR
- Storage memory: none

Input/output
- Keyboard: 32 keys
- Left-hand control: none
- External control: CV/Gate

The Moog Rogue is a monophonic analog synthesizer produced by Moog Music in the early 1980s. Very basic in its design and use, the Rogue featured a 32-note keyboard and two VCOs. VCO number 2 is tunable between a half-step below to an octave above VCO number 1. This allows the Rogue to play atonal sounds like the Moog Prodigy. The Rogue did not have features to allow the user full flexibility to program the patch settings. However, the VCF and the VCA were simple to operate. The design of the hard-wired patch system was well thought out (considering its size and cost) and a wide variety of sounds and modulation effects are possible. The Rogue also includes a Sample-and-Hold feature that the Prodigy does not. The synthesizer is most commonly used for its powerful bass. The Rogue is similar in some respects to the famous ARP Odyssey, though smaller and less versatile.

Moog Music was criticized for repackaging the Rogue as the Taurus II, changing the design to a pedal-operated synthesizer with little difference in sound quality.

The Rogue is very similar in design and sound to the less-expensive Realistic Concertmate MG-1, which was also manufactured by Moog Music around the same time for RadioShack under their Realistic brand. The MG-1 was perhaps the first example of a keyboard designed for the home musician.
