= Micromoog =

Monophonic analog synthesizer

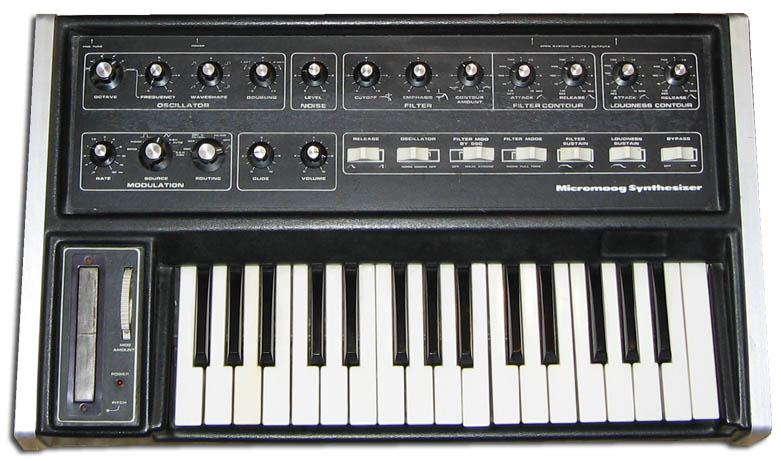
- Micromoog
- Manufacturer: Moog Music
- Dates: 1975–1979

Technical specifications
- Polyphony: Monophonic
- Timbrality: Monotimbral
- Oscillator: 1 variable waveshape
- LFO: 1 pulse/sawtooth
- Synthesis type: Analog Subtractive
- Filter: 1 lowpass
- Attenuator: 1 AR

Input/output
- Keyboard: 32-keys
- Left-hand control: Ribbon controller mod wheel
- External control: Moog Open System

The Moog model 2090 Micromoog is a monophonic analog synthesizer produced by Moog Music from 1975 to 1979.

== Background ==
Designed as a scaled-down, lower-priced alternative ($650–$800 market price) to the Minimoog, the Micromoog was designed to tap into a market of musicians who wanted an introduction to synthesis, but who could not afford the $1,500 Minimoog. It was designed by Moog Engineer Jim Scott in consultation with Tom Rhea, with electronic refinement input from David Luce and Robert Moog.

The Micromoog served as the basis for the Multimoog, a similarly styled, but more generously equipped synthesizer featuring two VCOs, a larger 44-note keyboard, greater modulation options and an early implementation of keyboard aftertouch functions.

== Features and architecture ==
While the basic synthesizer architecture of the Micromoog was a simple VCO/VCF/VCA, inexpensive enhancements provide different creative options than the Minimoog. Its single voltage-controlled oscillator's waveshape is variable from sawtooth to pulse, which can also be modulated. Additionally, a sub-octave can be added one or two octaves below. Its −24dB per octave low-pass filter has its own envelope generator and can be frequency-modulated by the VCO. The voltage-controlled amplifier has its own envelope generator. A noise generator, sample and hold, low-frequency oscillator, and modulation routing complete the voicing. Moog chose to use two A(S)R envelope generators (with switchable sustain) instead of the single ADSR more commonly found on budget synths. Other switches like VCA bypass, VCF tone mode and release on/off allow quick changes to be made live.

Micromoog demo sounds
A recording using only the Micromoog and some external reverb

Micromoog demo sounds
A recent piece recorded using a Micromoog and Roland TR-808 Drum Machine

It has a 32-note keyboard with a built-in ribbon controller instead of the more common pitch-bend wheel, although a retrofit pitch-bend wheel was available.

The Micromoog also features the Moog Open System control inputs, a pre-MIDI control system, which enables the unit to control or be controlled by other Moog synthesizers, even suggesting using it with Moog modules and sequencer. Unusually, the CV inputs were designed to operate at 0.95V per octave – the idea being that the 1V/octave outputs of synths could get loaded down, but could still be used into the Micromoog. In practice, this is hard to achieve and cannot exceed 0.98V per octave without modifications. Triggering is Moog standard S-triggering on Cinch Jones connectors. Modulation in/out is on a stereo 3/16" jack – a difficult connector to find. An "access pwr" socket is provided for connection of Moog accessories such as the drum controller, sample and hold, and ribbon controller.

The Micromoog has an audio input allowing external audio to be run through the filter and VCA.

The connections on the rear connection panel are as follows:

Outputs: LO Audio −10 dBm, HI Audio +12 dBm, S-trig, KBD, Access(ory) power ±15 VDC, 50 mA.

Inputs: filter, oscillator (0.95 volts per octave), S-trig, Audio Modulation

Early Micromoogs had slightly different panel labelling – from serial number 1500 "Articulator" become "Loudness Contour". Later Micromoogs also gained an extra potentiometer on the back to adjust the keyboard output tracking. There were also internal changes to the keyboard.

== Filter modification ==
The Micromoog has a design that limits its bass timbre. There is a modification that can be found here and has been said to make it able to compete with the Minimoog on a one oscillator level.

== See also ==
- Minimoog
- Multimoog
- Moog synthesizer
- Polymoog
- Robert Moog
- Moog Music
- List of Moog synthesizer players
- Wikipedia CV/Gate
