= Minimoog =

Analog synthesizer

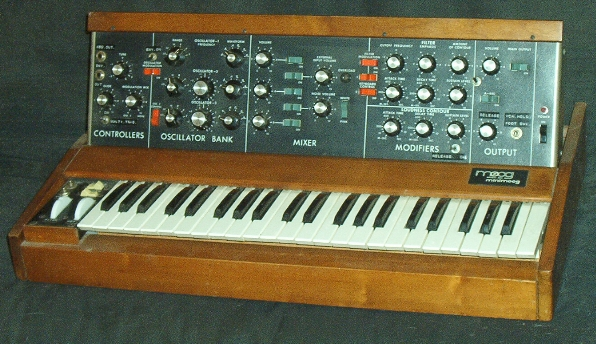
- Manufacturer: Moog Music
- Dates: 1970–81, 2016–2017, 2022-present

Technical specifications
- Polyphony: Monophonic
- Timbrality: Monotimbral
- Oscillator: 3 VCOs, white/pink noise generator
- LFO: Oscillator 3 can function as LFO (original and reissue), dedicated extra LFO (reissue only)
- Synthesis type: Analog subtractive
- Filter: 24dB/oct, 4-pole lowpass filter with cutoff, resonance, ADSR envelope generator, keyboard tracking
- Attenuator: ADSR envelope generator
- Effects: Frequency modulation using oscillator 3/noise

Input/output
- Keyboard: 44-note, low-note priority
- Left-hand control: Pitch bend and mod wheels
- External control: CV/gate; MIDI in/out/thru (reissue only); glide and decay via 0.206" dia Switchcraft S-260 plugs (original only)

The Minimoog is an analog synthesizer introduced by Moog Music in 1970. Designed as a more affordable, portable version of the modular Moog synthesizer, it was the first synthesizer sold in retail stores. It was first popular with progressive rock and jazz musicians and found wide use in disco, pop, rock and electronic music. In 2005, the Minimoog was inducted into the TECnology Hall of Fame.

Production of the Minimoog stopped in the early 1980s after the sale of Moog Music. In 2002, the founder, Robert Moog, regained the rights to the Moog brand, bought the company, and released an updated model, the Minimoog Voyager. In 2016 and 2022, Moog Music released newer versions of the original model.

== Development ==
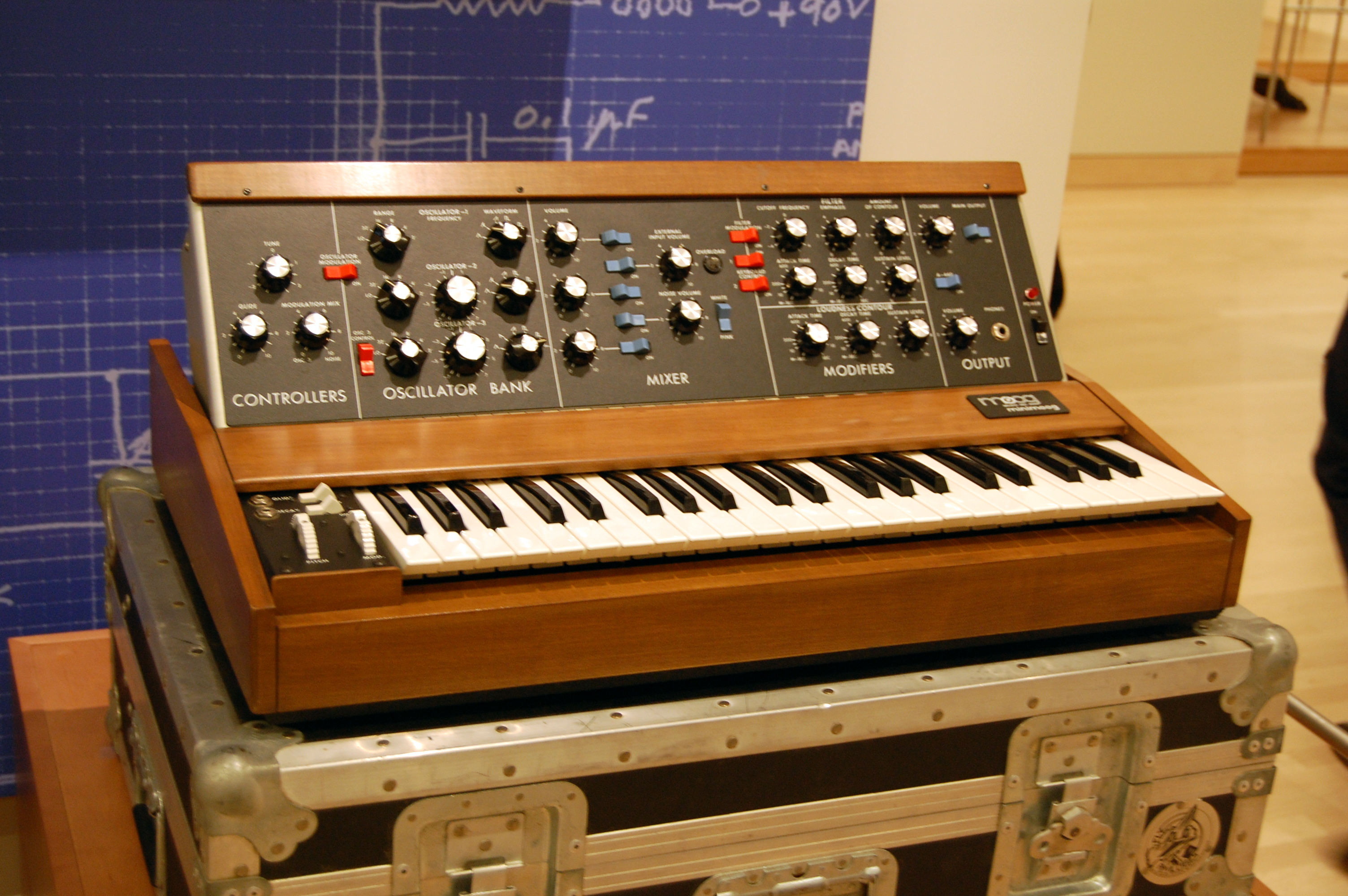
An early 1970s Minimoog Model D synthesizer

In the 1960s, R.A. Moog Co. manufactured Moog synthesizers, which expanded the popularity of electronic music but remained inaccessible to most. These were difficult to use and required users to connect components manually with patch cables to create sounds. They were also sensitive to temperature and humidity, and cost tens of thousands of dollars. Most were owned by universities or record labels, and used to create soundtracks or jingles; by 1970, only 28 were owned by musicians.

Hoping to create a smaller, more reliable synthesizer, the Moog engineer Bill Hemsath created a prototype, the Min A, by sawing a keyboard in half and wiring several unused modular components into a small cabinet. The Moog founder and president Robert Moog felt the prototype was "a fun experiment", but did not see a market for it. Moog and the engineers created the Model B and Model C prototypes, adding features to improve expression, ease of use and portability.

In early 1970, Moog Co. began losing money as interest in its modular synthesizers fell. Fearing they would lose their jobs if the company closed, the engineers developed the final version of Hemsath's miniature synthesizer, the Minimoog Model D, while Moog was away. Moog chastised them, but came to see the potential in the Model D and authorized its production.

As the engineers could not properly stabilize the power supply, the three oscillators were never completely synchronized, unintentionally creating the Minimoog's "warm, rich" sound. Its voltage-controlled filter was unique, allowing users to shape sounds to create "everything from blistering, funky bass blurps ... to spacey whistle lead tones". The Minimoog also was the first synthesizer to feature a pitch wheel, which allows players to bend notes as a guitarist or saxophonist does, allowing for more expressive playing. Moog's associate David Borden felt that Moog would have become extremely wealthy had he patented the pitch wheel.

== Release ==
Moog Co released the first Minimoog in 1970. Moog said it was conceived as a portable tool for session musicians, and the team expected to sell "maybe 100 of them". Moog became acquainted with the former evangelist and musician David Van Koevering, who was so impressed with the Minimoog that he began demonstrating it to musicians and music stores. Van Koevering's friend Glen Bell, founder of the restaurant chain Taco Bell, allowed him to use a building on a private island Bell owned in Florida. There, Van Koevering hosted an event he billed as Island of Electronicus, a "pseudo-psychedelic experience that brought counterculture (minus the drugs) to straight families and connected it with the sound of the Minimoog".

The Minimoog was the first synthesizer sold in retail stores. Despite the success, Moog could not afford to meet demand, nor did it have credit for a loan. In November 1971, Moog sold R. A. Moog, Inc. to the rival company muSonics and stayed as an employee until 1976. Van Koevering was hired as head of sales and marketing, expanding sales of the Minimoog worldwide. The Minimoog was in continuous production for 13 years and over 12,000 were made. Production stopped in July 1981. In 1993, Moog Co ceased production.

=== Later models ===
In the 1980s, the rights to use the Moog Music name in the United Kingdom were purchased by Alex Winter of Caerphilly, Wales, who commenced limited production of an updated Minimoog in 1998 as the Moog Minimoog 204E. The 204E added pulse width modulation and MIDI to the Model D specification.

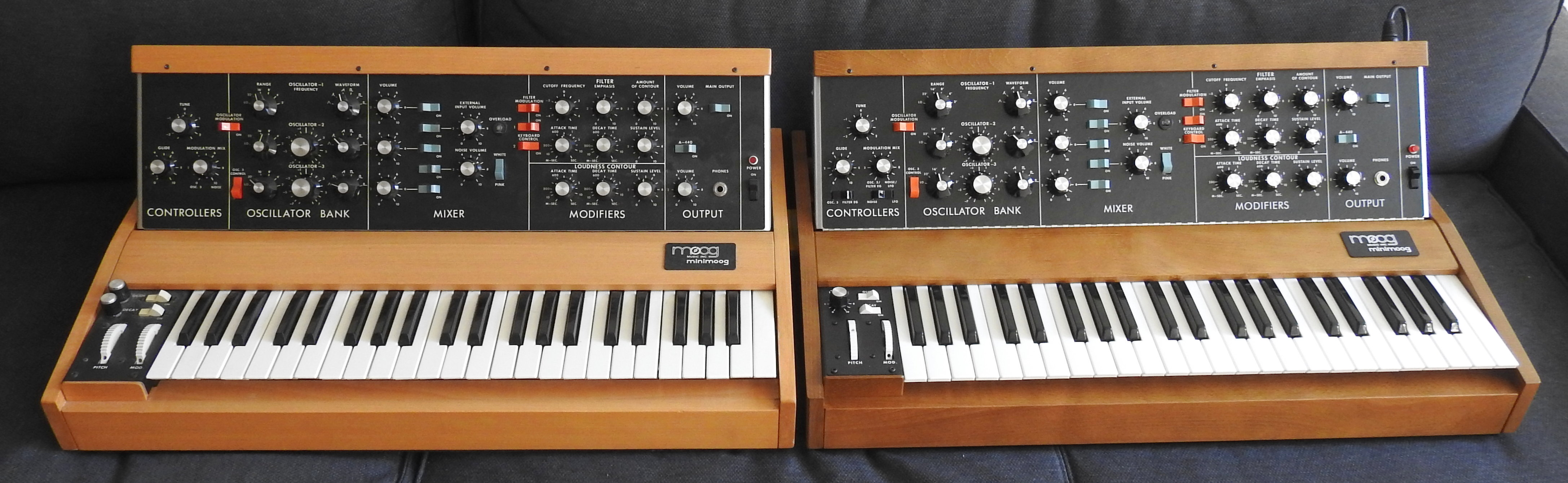
Minimoog from 1979 (left) and 2017

In 2002, Robert Moog reacquired the rights to the Moog name and bought the company. In 2002, Moog Co released the Minimoog Voyager, an updated version of the Minimoog that sold more than 14,000 units, more than the original Minimoog. Although the Welsh incarnation of Moog Music went into administration shortly afterwards, Winter retained the rights to the Moog name in the UK, with the result that the Minimoog Voyager was launched there as the Voyager by Bob Moog.

In 2016, Moog Music began manufacturing an updated version of the Model D, with an independent LFO and MIDI, and an aftertouch and velocity-sensitive keyboard. Production ended around August 2017, after a little under a year. In 2018, Moog Music released the Minimoog Model D app for iOS. In 2022, after being out of production for over five years, the Model D was reissued a third time, with new features such as a spring-loaded pitch-bend wheel and updated MIDI specification.

== Impact ==
According to TJ Pinch, author of Analog Days, the Minimoog was the first synthesizer to become a "classic". Wired described it as "the most famous synthesizer in music history ... a ubiquitous analog keyboard that can be heard in countless pop, rock, hip-hop, and techno tracks from the 1970s, 80s, and 90s". It was also important for its portability. Borden said the Minimoog "took the synthesizer out of the studio and put it into the concert hall". According to David McNamee of The Guardian, "Tweaked now so that the synthesizer could reliably perform as either a melodic lead or propulsive bass instrument (rather than just as a complex sound-generating machine), the Minimoog changed everything ... the Moogs oozed character. Their sound could be quirky, kitsch and cute, or pulverising, but it was always identifiable as Moog."

The Minimoog changed the dynamics of rock bands. For the first time, keyboardists could play solos in the style of lead guitarists, or play synthesized basslines. Yes keyboardist Rick Wakeman said: "For the first time you could go on [stage] and give the guitarist a run for his money... A guitarist would say, 'Oh shoot, he's got a Minimoog,' so they're looking for eleven on their volume control - it's the only way they can compete." Wakeman said the instrument "absolutely changed the face of music".

The Minimoog took a place in mainstream black music, most notably in the work of Stevie Wonder. Its use for basslines became particularly popular in funk, as in the Parliament track "Flash Light". It was also popular in jazz, and Sun Ra became perhaps the first musician to perform and record with the instrument on his 1970 album My Brother the Wind. Herbie Hancock, Dick Hyman, and Chick Corea were other early adopters in jazz.

The Minimoog became a staple of progressive rock. In the early 1970s, Keith Emerson of Emerson, Lake & Palmer added the Minimoog to his modular 'Monster Moog' as an occasional part of his performances. Wakeman used five Minimoogs on stage so he could play different sounds without having to reconfigure them. It was also used by electronic artists such as Kraftwerk, who used it on their albums Autobahn (1974) and The Man-Machine (1978), and later by Tangerine Dream, Klaus Schulze, and Gary Numan. In the late 1970s and the early 1980s, it was widely used in the emerging disco genre by artists including ABBA and Giorgio Moroder.

In 2005, the Minimoog was inducted into the TECnology Hall of Fame, an honor given to "products and innovations that have had an enduring impact on the development of audio technology". In 2012, to celebrate Bob Moog's birthday, Google created an interactive Minimoog-inspired web application as its Google Doodle. In 2017, Roland released the SE-02, a compact synthesizer modeled on the Minimoog, as part of their Boutique series.

== See also ==
- Multimoog
- Micromoog
- Memorymoog
- Polymoog
