= Analog device =

Combination of analog machine and media

Analog devices are a combination of both analog machine and analog media that can together measure, record, reproduce, receive or broadcast continuous information, for example, the almost infinite number of grades of transparency, voltage, resistance, rotation, or pressure. In theory, the continuous information in an analog signal has an infinite number of possible values with the only limitation on resolution being the accuracy of the analog device.

Analog media are materials with analog properties, such as photographic film, which are used in analog devices, such as cameras.

== Example devices ==
=== Non-electrical ===
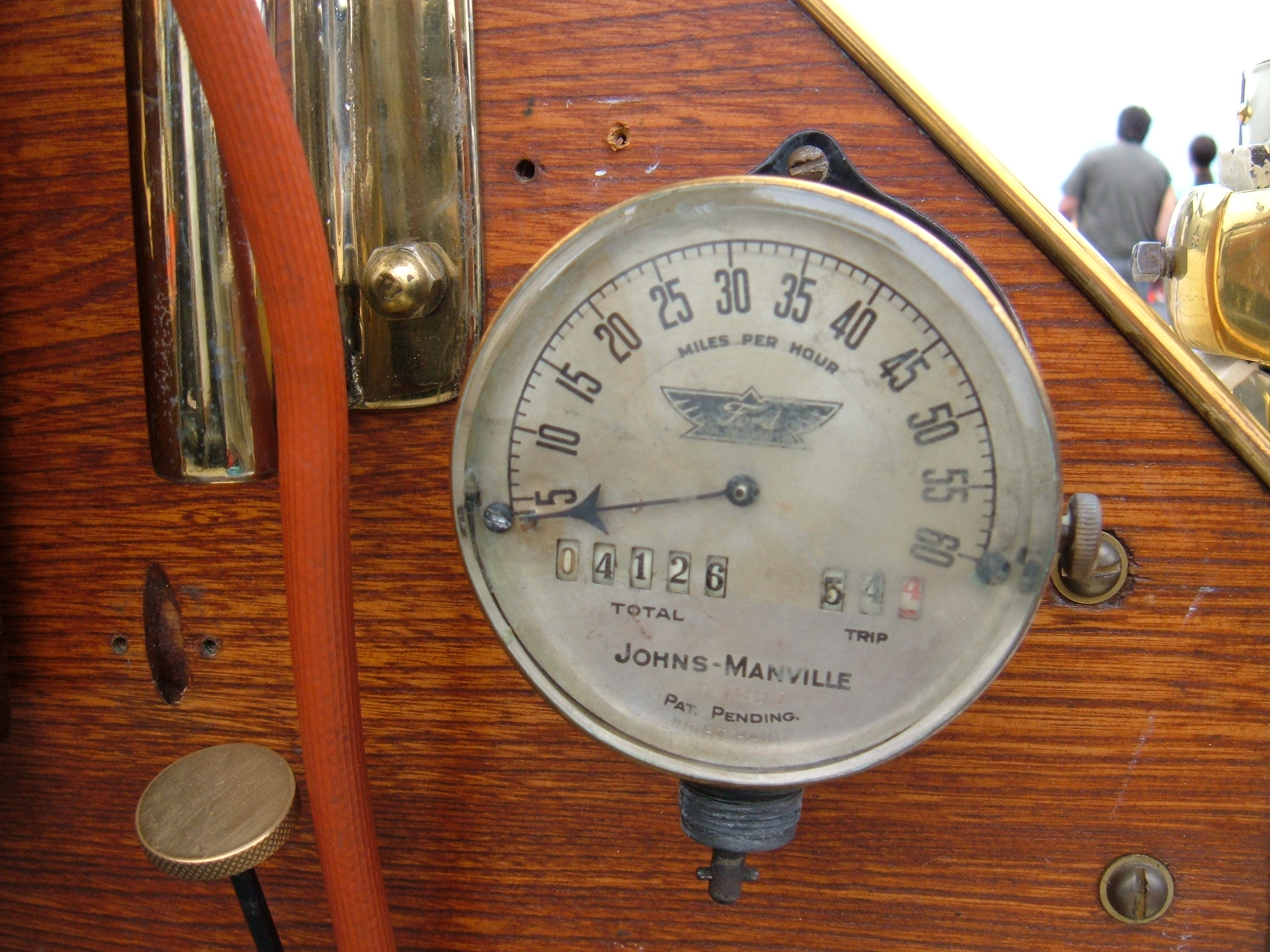
An analog speedometer dial on a Model T Ford

There are notable non-electrical analog devices, such as some clocks (sundials, water clocks), the astrolabe, slide rules, the governor of a steam engine, the planimeter (a simple device that measures the surface area of a closed shape), Kelvin's mechanical tide predictor, acoustic rangefinders, servomechanisms (e.g. the thermostat), a simple mercury thermometer, a weighing scale, and the speedometer.

=== Electrical ===
The telautograph is an analogue precursor to the modern fax machine. It transmits electrical impulses recorded by potentiometers to stepping motors attached to a pen, thus being able to reproduce a drawing or signature made by the sender at the receiver's station. It was the first such device to transmit drawings to a stationary sheet of paper; previous inventions in Europe used rotating drums to make such transmissions.

An analog synthesizer is a synthesizer that uses analog circuits and analog computer techniques to generate sound electronically.

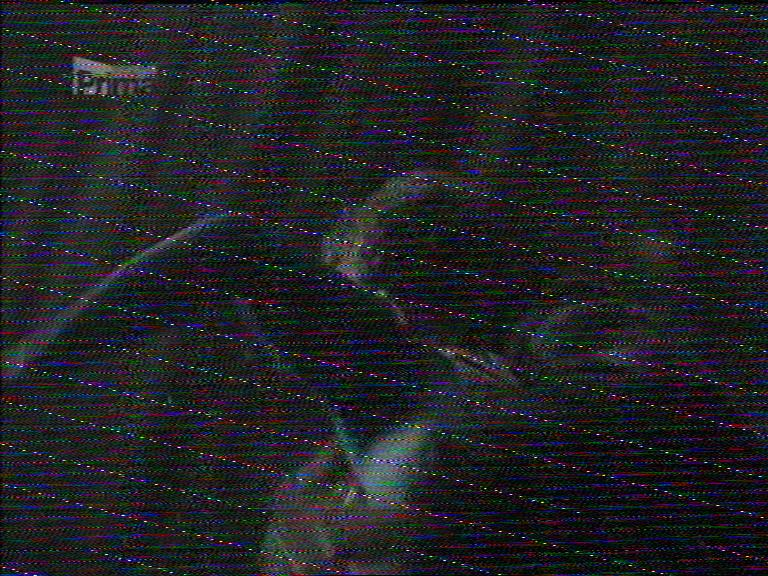
Electrical interference visible on an analog television broadcast

The analog television encodes television and transports the picture and sound information as an analog signal, that is, by varying the amplitude and/or frequencies of the broadcast signal. All systems preceding digital television, such as NTSC, PAL, and SECAM are analog television systems.

An analog computer is a form of computer that uses electrical, mechanical, or hydraulic phenomena to model the problem being solved. More generally an analog computer uses one kind of physical quantity to represent the behavior of another physical system, or mathematical function. Modeling a real physical system in a computer is called simulation.

== Example processes ==
=== Media ===
The chemical reactions in photographic film and film stock involve analog processes, with camera as machinery.

== Digital interfacing ==
In electronics, a digital-to-analog converter is a circuit for converting a digital signal (usually binary) to an analog signal (current, voltage or electric charge). Digital-to-analog converters are interfaces between the digital world and analog worlds. An analog-to-digital converter is an electronic circuit that converts continuous signals to discrete digital numbers.
