= Audio filter =

Frequency dependent circuit

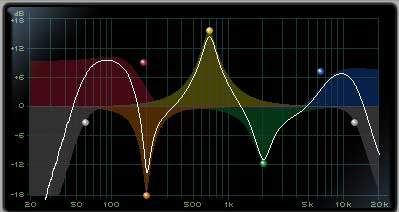
Digital domain parametric equalisation

An audio filter is a frequency-dependent circuit, an electronic filter, working in the audio frequency range, 0 Hz to 20 kHz. Audio filters can amplify (boost), pass or attenuate (cut) some frequency ranges. Many types of filters exist for different audio applications including hi-fi stereo systems, musical synthesizers, effects units, sound reinforcement systems, instrument amplifiers and virtual reality systems.

== Types ==
Low-pass
Low-pass filters pass through frequencies below their cutoff frequencies, and progressively attenuate frequencies above the cutoff frequency. Low-pass filters are used in audio crossovers to remove high-frequency content from signals being sent to a low-frequency subwoofer system.

High-pass
A high-pass filter does the opposite, passing high frequencies above the cutoff frequency, and progressively attenuating frequencies below the cutoff frequency. A high-pass filter can be used in an audio crossover to remove low-frequency content from a signal being sent to a tweeter.

Band-pass
A band-pass filter passes frequencies between its two cutoff frequencies while attenuating those outside the range. A band-reject filter attenuates frequencies between its two cutoff frequencies while passing those outside the 'reject' range.

All-pass
An all-pass filter passes all frequencies but affects the phase of any given sinusoidal component according to its frequency.

== Applications ==
In some applications, such as in the design of graphic equalizers or CD players, the filters are designed according to a set of objective criteria such as passband, passband attenuation, stopband, and stopband attenuation, where the passbands are the frequency ranges for which audio is attenuated less than a specified maximum, and the stopbands are the frequency ranges for which the audio must be attenuated by a specified minimum. In more complex cases, an audio filter can provide a feedback loop, which introduces resonance (ringing) alongside attenuation. Audio filters can also be designed to provide gain (boost) as well as attenuation. In other applications, such as with synthesizers or sound effects, the aesthetic of the filter must be evaluated subjectively.

Audio filters can be implemented in analog circuitry as analog filters or in DSP code or computer software as digital filters.

== Self-oscillation ==
Self-oscillation occurs when the resonance or Q factor of the cutoff frequency of the filter is set high enough that the internal feedback causes the filter circuitry to become a sine tone sine wave oscillator.

== See also ==
- Audio equalization
- Electrical resonance
- Linear filter
- Self-resonant frequency
