= Moogfest =

Music and technology festival

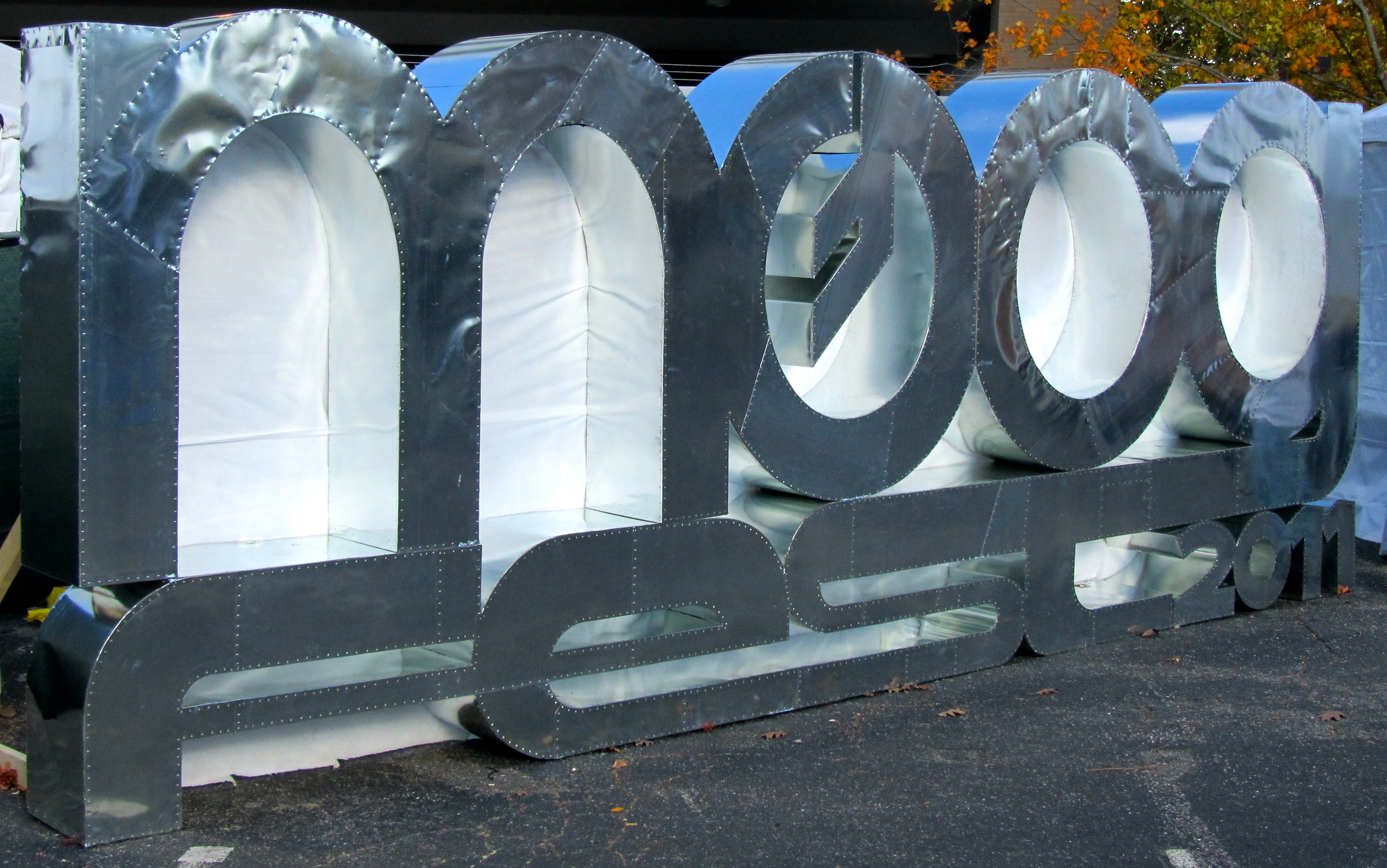
- MoogFest 2011 Logo Monument
- Genre: Electronic music, indie rock, alternative rock
- Dates: Varies
- Locations: New York City (2004–08); Asheville, North Carolina (2010–14); Durham, North Carolina (2016–present)
- Years active: 2004–08, 2010–14, 2016–2019
- Founders: Moog Music
- Website: moogfest.com

Moogfest was a music and technology festival held in Durham, North Carolina, that honored engineer Robert Moog and his inventions. It was first held in New York City, and after a hiatus took place in Asheville, North Carolina, for five years before moving to Durham.

The multi-day event features performances by artists who use Moog instruments as well as others whose work is influenced by Bob Moog. It also includes interactive experiences, visual art exhibitions, installations, film screenings, panel discussions, and workshops..

== Festival history ==
=== Background and origins ===
[Robert Moog] brought electronic music to the masses and changed the way we hear music.

— Charles Carlini

His invention is ubiquitous and has had as much if not more impact than the invention of the piano. He's probably one of the most important musical instrument makers in history. With the Minimoog, he took the synthesizer out of the studio and put it into the concert hall.

— David Borden

For the first time you could go on [stage] and give the guitarist a run for his money ... a guitarist would say, 'Oh shoot, he's got a Minimoog', so they're looking for eleven on their volume control — it's the only way they can compete. [It] absolutely changed the face of music.

— Rick Wakeman

The sound defined progressive music as we know it.

— Keith Emerson

Robert Moog, born on May 23, 1934, in New York City and died on August 21, 2005, in Asheville, North Carolina, developed his first commercial voltage-controlled analog synthesizer with American composer, inventor, and educator Herbert Deutsch in 1964. At the time, other synthesizers were already on the market, but Moog synthesizer began to gain wider attention in the music industry after it was demonstrated at the Monterey International Pop Festival in 1967. The Beatles, Mick Jagger and Sun Ra were among the first customers, but the commercial breakthrough of a Moog recording was made by Wendy Carlos in the 1968 record Switched-On Bach, which became one of the highest-selling classical music recordings of its era. Keith Emerson first discovered the Moog when he heard Switched-On Bach, and one year later in 1970, he wanted to take it on the road with him. Robert Moog replied that there was no chance because the machine was too fragile and required extensive training to operate properly, but Emerson finally convinced Moog and the Minimoog was released.

Keith Emerson was the first musician to tour with a Minimoog during Emerson, Lake & Palmer's Pictures at an Exhibition shows. The Minimoog became the most popular monophonic synthesizer of the 1970s, and it was quickly taken up by leading rock and electronic music groups such as Yes, Tangerine Dream, Parliament-Funkadelic, Pink Floyd, Devo, Yellow Magic Orchestra, Gary Numan, and Rush, and musicians such as Pete Townshend, George Harrison, Ray Manzarek, Stevie Wonder, Joe Zawinul, Chick Corea, Isao Tomita, and Herbie Hancock. In 1974 the German electronic group Kraftwerk further popularized the sound of the synthesizer with their landmark album Autobahn, which used several types of synthesizer including a Minimoog. Italian producer and composer Giorgio Moroder helped to shape the development of disco music. The Minimoog was highly popular in the 1970s and 1980s, and has been used by many artists. The Moog also became synonymous with funk and West Coast hip hop, techno, sci-fi sounds, and the instrument figured in the most classic of classic rock albums such as Abbey Road and Who's Next.

David Borden, former director of the Cornell University Digital Music Program, who worked alongside Robert Moog in his Trumansburg studios and later founded the first live synthesizer ensemble, Mother Mallard's Portable Masterpiece Company, in 2000 performed at the Smithsonian Institution in Washington, D.C., with his Mother Mallard and Keith Emerson, in an event honoring Moog called The Keyboard Meets Modern Technology. This event, somehow, came just four years before the first Moogfest was held in New York City.

=== The New York years (2004–2008) ===
They wanted to do it in New York, where Bob had grown up, around the time of his birthday. They had heard about work I had done with Les Paul. I put together a list of artists who were well known Moog users and was excited to get Keith Emerson and Rick Wakeman, who had never performed on the same stage before.

— Charles Carlini

I'm an engineer. I see myself as a toolmaker and the musicians are my customers. They use the tools.

— Robert Moog

Moog Music, David Olivier, Moog Music's New York area representative, contacted Charles Carlini, a New York-based music and concert promoter, about producing an event to celebrate the 50th anniversary of the company and its involvement in electronic music. The first event, presented by Clinic Crafters Workshop and Sam Ash Music, entitled Manny's Music Presents MoogFest!: A Free Moog Clinic Featuring Keith Emerson and Bob Moog, was held at Manny's Music store on May 17, 2004, just one day before the official date for the Festival. The first Moogfest was held at B.B. King Blues Club & Grill in Times Square on Tuesday, May 18. Randy Fuchs, the artist relations director for Moog, contacted Keith Emerson, Rick Wakeman, Jordan Rudess, Bernie Worrell and other well-known Moog users and put them in touch with Charles Carlini. It was a sold-out, one-night, one-time, four-hour gala that saw Keith Emerson, Rick Wakeman of Yes on the day of his birthday, Bernie Worrell of Parliament-Funkadelic, and jazz fusion guitarist Stanley Jordan among those who played in front of an audience of around 600. The Moogfest 2005 at B.B. King's on May 31, was a great success and saw the participation of Edgar Winter, Will Calhoun of Living Colour, Brazilian Girls, Jordan Rudess of Dream Theater, Frank Zappa's keyboardist Don Preston, Miles Davis' keyboardist Adam Holzman, Money Mark of the Beastie Boys, Steve Molitz of Particle and DJ Logic, but not Bob Moog, who was sick and died from brain cancer on August 21, 2005.

Carlini continued to cultivate Moogfest as a tribute to Bob Moog. He said that "[m]y vision was to work with musicians who defined the instrument and had a very tight relationship with Bob; most were actual friends who would call him on the phone. I wanted to keep it pure." The Moogfest 2006 at B.B. King on Thursday, June 22, saw Keith Emerson returning to headline, together with Jan Hammer, Roger O'Donnell of The Cure, Jordan Rudess of Dream Theater, The Mahavishnu Project with Miles Davis' keyboardist Adam Holzman, The School of Rock, and DJ Logic. Part of the event was filmed and then released in DVD format by MVD in June 2007. Keith Emerson and Jan Hammer were the recipients of the first ever Bob Moog Legacy Award. Mike Adams, president of Moog Music announced the inception of the award and called on the stage Roger O'Donnell and Jordan Rudess to present them. On the evening of Thursday September 20, 2007, Moogfest, in conjunction with the Bob Moog Foundation, presented the first annual Moogfest Symposium. Herbert Deutsch, Gershon Kingsley, Joel Chadabe, John Eaton, David Borden, and Trevor Pinch attended the symposium arranged by Bob's daughter Michelle at the Music Department of the Columbia University, an afternoon of lectures and talks to discuss how the Moog synthesizer has affected their own work. The Moogfest 2007, once again at B.B. King on Saturday, September 22, included Thomas Dolby, after a 15-year hiatus from the music business, Jordan Rudess of Dream Theater, Miles Davis' keyboardist Adam Holzman, Spiraling, Frank Zappa's keyboardist Don Preston, Gershon Kingsley, Herbert Deutsch, and Erik Norlander, among others. Thereminist Shueh-li Ong with Xenovibes; reportedly the second thereminist who has performed at a Moogfest so far, opened. Herbert Deutsch and Gershon Kingsley were the recipients of the Bob Moog Legacy Award for their unique, lasting artistry as expressed through Moog instruments. This was the last time that B.B. King held the festival.

The fifth edition of Moogfest in 2008 brought a change of venues, from the B.B King to the more expansive Hammerstein Ballroom in Manhattan Center. Carlini explained this shift: "Mike Adams wanted to see a younger generation learn about Moog and pushed for jam band Umphrey's McGee as headliner." The show was set for October 13, the second Monday of October, an official holiday celebrated as Columbus Day, but it was also during the 2008 financial crisis. The event, featuring Umphrey's McGee, Eric McFadden Trio, Bernie Worrell of P-Funk, Aron Magner of Disco Biscuits, Jamie Shields of The New Deal, Joe Russo and others, had a very poor turnout and Carlini relinquished the Moogfest name to Moog Music. Bernie Worrell was the recipient of the Bob Moog Legacy Award for his groundbreaking use of the synthesizer in the areas of funk, rhythm and blues, and rock and roll.

This was the last time that Moogfest was held in New York City and there was no Moogfest in 2009.

=== Moogfest in Asheville (2010–2012) ===
When we first proposed to move Moogfest, we did so because Asheville has a great history for us of supporting live music events. Plus, it was Bob Moog's adopted hometown and continues to be the headquarters of Moog Music, so it seemed like the perfect location.

— Ashley Capps, founder of AC Entertainment

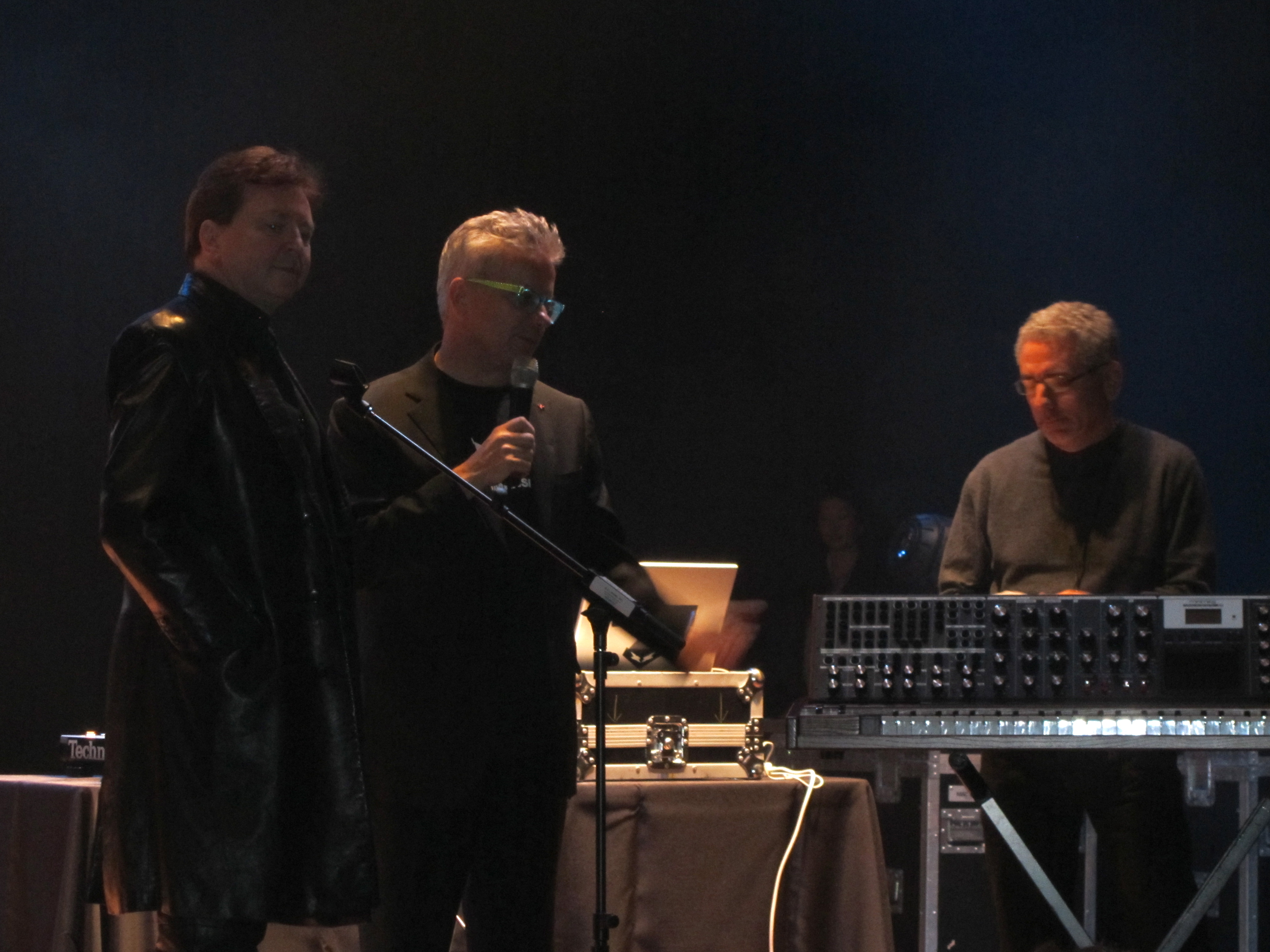
Mark Mothersbaugh and Gerald Casale accept Moog Innovator Award

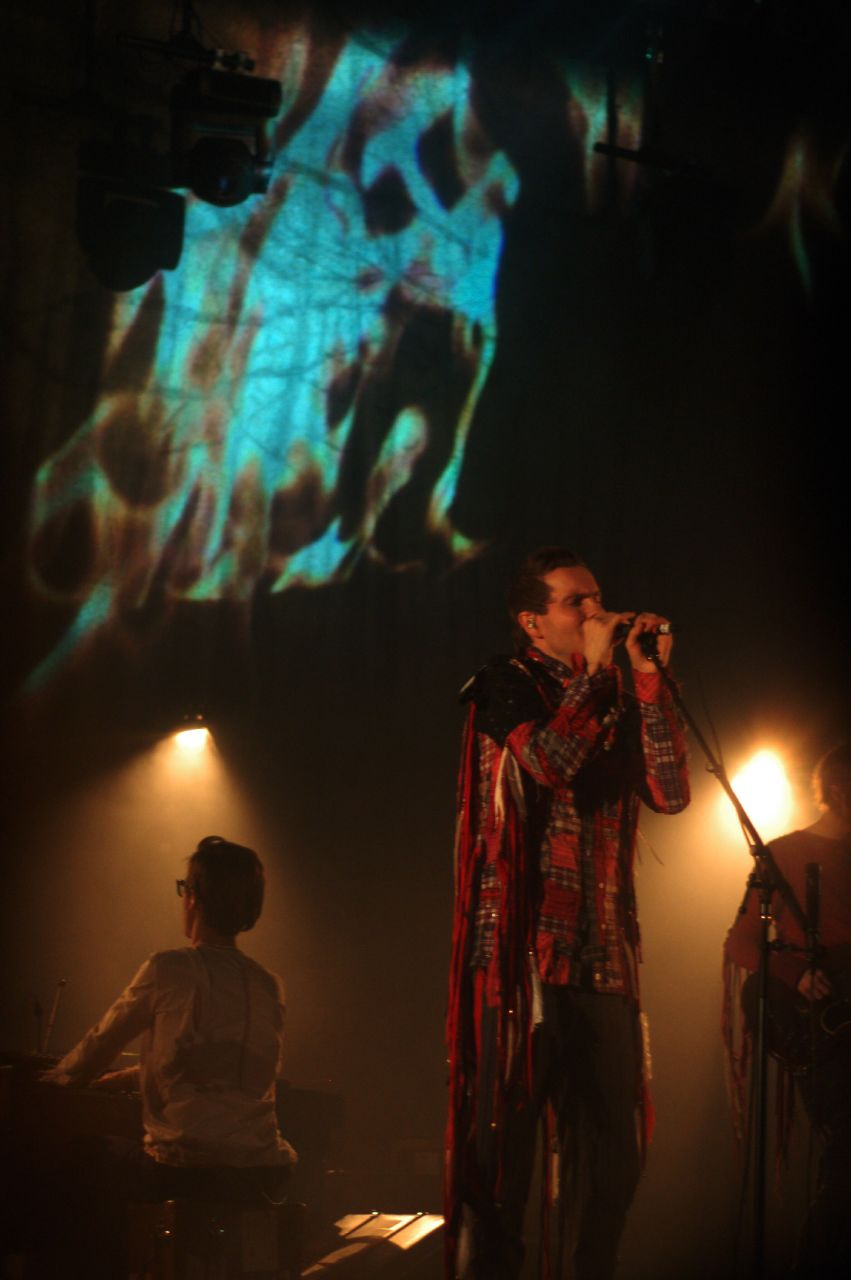
Jonsi performing at Moogfest 2010

In 2010, Moog Music partnered with AC Entertainment, a music promotion company that co-produces the Bonnaroo Music & Arts Festival, moved Moogfest from New York City to Asheville in North Carolina, and expanded it from a one evening event to a three-day, multi-venue festival during the last weekend of October. The sixth Moogfest, but first in Asheville, took place in five stages at places in downtown Asheville that ranged from clubs to arenas, and drew 7,000 to 7,500 people a day. The festival, from Friday October 29 through to Sunday October 31, 2010, featured more than 60 acts that ranged from rock to hip-hop to electronica, including Massive Attack, Sleigh Bells, Caribou, MGMT, Thievery Corporation, Hot Chip, Disco Biscuits, Big Boi, El-P, Four Tet, Pretty Lights, Bonobo, Jon Hopkins, and Dan Deacon. Devo were the recipient of the Moog Innovator Award, but the band could not perform, because its guitarist, Bob Mothersbaugh, injured his hand. Though Moog instruments, such as the Voyager, Moogerfooger, Etherwave Theremin, and Little Phatty were highly used by the performers participating in the event, the bands requested to play were not chosen by their involvement with Moog, but rather by their overall creativity and likeliness to Bob Moog's creative entity.

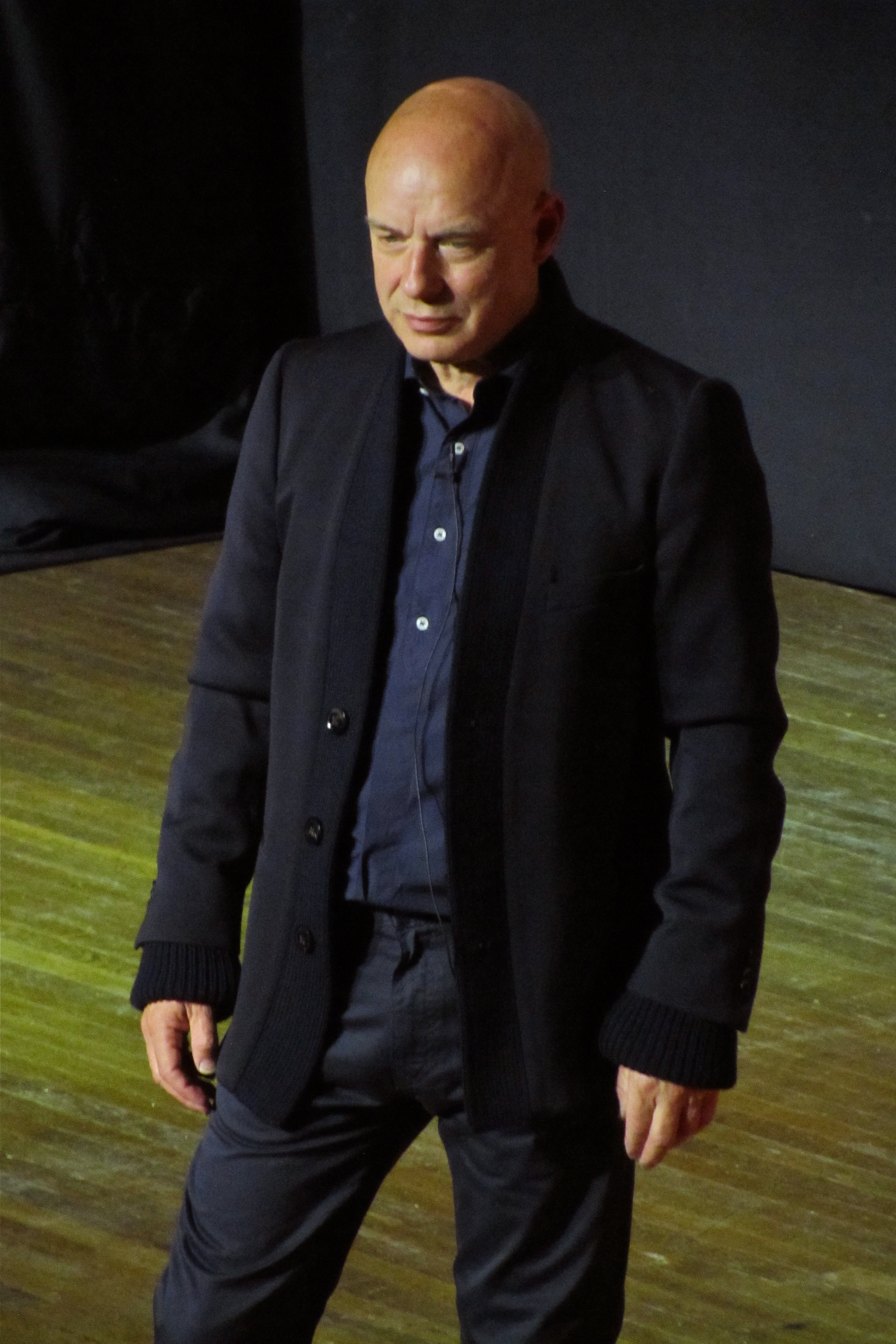
Brian Eno at MoogFest 2011

The seventh edition, second for both Asheville and AC Entertainment, of the Moogfest was held on October 28–30, 2011, on Halloween weekend with a line-up of popular artists from varied genres, including The Flaming Lips, Terry and Gyan Riley, Moby, Passion Pit, Sound Tribe Sector 9, Tangerine Dream, and TV on the Radio. The 2011 festival also featured "SYNTH: A Group Art Show Inspired by Bob Moog", which is a showcase of handmade limited-edition screen prints by some of the top concert poster artists and graphic designers working today, and 77 Million Paintings, an art exhibit and talk by electronic music pioneer Brian Eno, and moreover panel discussions, question and answer sessions, art exhibitions and installations, film screenings, and workshops. Minimalist composer, Terry Riley, performed a set lasting for almost two straight hours. In 2011, Moogfest updated its festival technologies by releasing a Moogfest iPhone app. The app contained a festival map and schedule, and also sent users real-time updates about festival news and unannounced secret shows.

After the festival weekend, Asheville's local newspaper released that over 30 arrests were made during Moogfest 2011. Most of these were drug- or alcohol-related charges.

The 2012 Moogfest featured Primus's 3D Tour, Orbital, Miike Snow, Santigold, Richie Hawtin, Squarepusher, Explosions in the Sky, The Magnetic Fields, Four Tet, Divine Fits, GZA performing Liquid Swords, Carl Craig, Pantha Du Prince, Shpongle, Thomas Dolby, Black Moth Super Rainbow, Actress, Cold Cave, El-P, Prefuse 73, Bear in Heaven, Killer Mike, Blondes, Julia Holter, Disclosure, Exit Music, Trust, Death Grips, and Wick-it the Instigator.

=== Moogfest in Asheville (2013–2014) ===
After the 2012 Moogfest, it was announced that AC Entertainment was not renewed as a partner with the Bob Moog Foundation. The Foundation held the rights to the name, and thus there was no official "Moogfest" in 2013. However, AC Entertainment organized a "spiritual successor" for 2013 – the Mountain Oasis Electronic Music Summit – which again took place on Halloween weekend and utilized largely the same Asheville venues that Moogfest had in prior years. Additionally, it was announced in 2013 that Moogfest would officially return to Asheville in 2014 and that it would be run by the Bob Moog Foundation, without AC Entertainment.

Moogfest 2014 took place in Asheville over five days, from Wednesday, April 23 to Sunday, April 27. It featured performances from Kraftwerk, Pet Shop Boys, M.I.A, Giorgio Moroder, CHIC featuring Nile Rodgers, Flying Lotus, Keith Emerson, Dillon Francis, El-P, YACHT, RJD2, Riff Raff, Avey Tare's Slasher Flicks, Just Blaze, Holly Herndon, Chris Clark, Machinedrum, Le1f, Bottin, Metro Area, Com Truise, Dan Deacon, Saul Williams, Zeds Dead, TOKiMONSTA, The Gaslamp Killer, Green Velvet, Moderat, Shigeto, Factory Floor, Wolf Eyes, Tiga, Teengirl Fantasy, and many more.

=== Moogfest in Durham (2016–2019) ===
There was no Moogfest in 2015, as the organizers considered it a biennial event. For 2016, the festival was moved from Asheville to Durham. Festival organizers took the opportunity to publicly denounce the controversial North Carolina Public Facilities Privacy & Security Act, commonly referred to as "House Bill 2". In response, the festival partnered with activist groups for a campaign called "Synthesize Love", raising funds to fight HB2 through T-shirt sales. They also held an anti-HB2 forum and "Open Mic," and provided gender-neutral bathrooms at most venues.

The festival's 2016 headliners were ODESZA, Grimes, Miike Snow, Gary Numan (3 night residency), GZA (2 night residency), Laurie Anderson, Explosions in the Sky, Blood Orange, sunn O))), Oneohtrix Point Never, The Orb, and keynote speakers Dr. Martine Rothblatt and Jaron Lanier. Other performers and presenters at the festival included Reggie Watts, Silver Apples, Actress, Tim Hecker, Ben Frost, Suzanne Ciani, YACHT, Robert Hood, Hundred Waters, HEALTH, Daniel Lanois, Son Lux, Julia Holter, Ryan Hemsworth, The Body, Floating Points, The Range, Empress Of, DJ Lance Rock with Yo Gabba Gabba!, Disasterpeace, Laurel Halo, Lunice, Kode9, Tyondai Braxton, Janelle Monáe, and more.

However, the festival and parent company Moog Music Inc. has been the subject of several lawsuits, for complaints including breach of contract, non-payment, and fraud, including a 2019 lawsuit filed by Q Level LLC and another lawsuit filed in 2021 by Moogfest LLC and UG Strategies LLC, as well as a 2020 sexual discrimination lawsuit filed by former employee Hannah Green.

== Locations ==
=== New York (2004–2008) ===
New York City was the home of the festival for its first five editions, from 2004 to 2008.

==== Manny's Music ====
Manny's Music was a music store that opened in 1935, located on 156 West 48th Street, between 6th and 7th Avenues near Times Square in Manhattan (40.759435°N 73.983378°W). Manny's Music saw the very first event, entitled Manny's Music Presents MoogFest!: A Free Moog Clinic Featuring Keith Emerson and Bob Moog, that was held at Manny's Music store on May 17, 2004, one day before the official date of the first Moogfest.

==== B.B. King Blues Club & Grill ====
The B.B. King Blues Club & Grill is a live music venue located in the heart of Times Square, on 237 42nd Street (40.756844°N 73.988504°W). The first Moogfest as well as the second edition of 2005, the third edition of 2006, and the fourth edition of 2007 were all held at the B.B. King.

==== Hammerstein Ballroom ====
The Hammerstein Ballroom, located within the Manhattan Center Studios on 311 West 34th Street in Manhattan (40.752486°N 73.993836°W), is a two-tiered, 12,000 square feet (1,100 m^{2}) ballroom known for its elegant appearance and excellent acoustical design. The ballroom seats 2,500 people for theatrical productions and musical performances, the two main balconies seat a total of 1,200, and the floor slants down to the stage area to enable those in the back rows to see easily. The Hammerstein Ballroom was home of the fifth edition of Moogfest in 2008.

=== Asheville (2010–2014) ===
The Moogfest's primary venues are all located on the north side of Asheville's downtown.

==== Asheville Civic Center ====
The Asheville Civic Center, located at number 87 of Haywood Street (35.597144°N 82.555635°W), houses both the 6,000-capacity Asheville Civic Center Arena, and the smaller 2,400-seat Thomas Wolfe Auditorium.

==== Animoog Playground ====
The Animoog Playground is an all ages outdoor, open air space with interactive art installations located at the Renaissance Asheville Hotel. (35.597609°N 82.550041°W). Beginning with the 2011 festival, it hosted late afternoon and evening performances. The Animoog playground hosted some of the largest events at the 2011 Moogfest, such as performances by Chromeo, Crystal Castles, The Flaming Lips, and Passion Pit.

==== The Orange Peel ====
The Orange Peel, located at number 101 of Biltmore Avenue (35.591393°N 82.551148°W), is a 1,100-capacity club named by Rolling Stone magazine as one of the best rock clubs in the country. The Orange Peel also holds a Minimoogseum: A History of the Minimoog and a Playable Theremin.

==== Diana Wortham Theatre ====
The Diana Wortham Theatre is a 500-seat venue located at number 2 of South Pack Square (35.594652°N 82.551354°W) that hosts live exhibitions.

==== Moogaplex ====
The Moogaplex, located at the Haywood Park Hotel complex at number 1 of Battery Park Avenue (35.595316°N 82.554885°W), is an all ages venue that hosts the Moog Workshops & Panels with a capacity of 250 people, and the Synth Art Show and DJ's sets with a capacity of 400 people.

==== Asheville Music Hall ====
The Asheville Music Hall is an 18+ venue with a capacity of 400 people located at number 31 of Patton Avenue (35.59485°N 82.553041°W) and hosts live events. The Asheville Music Hall had previously been known as Stella Blue, but the name was changed just prior to the 2011 festival. In the 2010 edition of the festival, Stella Blue hosted some national and regional emerging acts. In 2011, Stella Blue was renamed as the Asheville Music Hall, though it served the same purpose as it did the year before.

==== Fine Arts Theater ====
The Fine Arts Theater is a 250-seat movie theater located at number 36 of Biltmore Avenue (35.593617°N 82.550989°W). It is the place where Moogfest screens films related to Moog such as Moog, the 2004 documentary film by Hans Fjellestad about electronic instruments pioneer Robert Moog. In 2011, the only event the Fine Arts Theater venue was used for was Tara Busch's Live Film Scoring on the last day of the festival.

==== YMI Cultural Center ====
The YMI Cultural Center is located at number 39 of S Market Street # B (35.593818°N 82.550041°W) and hosts small live events. In 2011, Brian Eno's 77 Million Paintings installation was displayed at the YMI Cultural center. It started Moogfest weekend, but then became open to the public and continued to run from November 2 through November 30.

==== Moog Music factory ====
The Moog Music factory is located at number 160 of Broadway Street (35.600165°N 82.554559°W) and holds some events as part of the festival. In addition to their own on-stage performances at the 2011 Moogfest, Alan Palomo of Neon Indian, and Dan Deacon held a live in-store collaboration performed on Moog instruments. The Moog Music Factory also doubles as a shop selling Moog products such as Mooger Foogers, Moog Voyagers, Moog Theremins.

== Lineups ==
=== 2004 ===
The first Moogfest was a sold-out four-hour gala held at the B.B. King Blues Club & Grill in Times Square, Manhattan on Tuesday, May 18.

Setlist	Personnel
Suzanne Ciani; 1. Unknown; 2. "Rain"; 3. "The Velocity of Love"; Maximum Grooves; 1. "Cactus"; 2. "Hypnotized" (with Cassandra Reed on vocals); Joe Gallivan and Graham Haynes; 1. Unknown; Bernie Worrell and DJ Logic; 1. Unknown; 2. Unknown (with Graham Haynes); Keith Emerson, Rick Wakeman, Robert Moog; 1. Happy Birthday to Rick Wakeman; Rick Wakeman with Jordan Rudess; 1. excerpts from The Six Wives of Henry VIII (1973 and Journey to the Centre of the Earth (1974) including a long version of "Catherine Parr"; Pamelia Kurstin on Theremin; 1. Unknown; Eumir Deodato and Steve Molitz; 1. "Also sprach Zarathustra" (with Maximum Grooves); Stanley Jordan; 1. Unknown; 2. Unknown; 3. Unknown; Bob Moog; 1. Bob Moog Speech; Keith Emerson; 1. "America"; 2. "Hoedown"; 3. "Tarkus"; 4. "Fanfare for the Common Man"	Keith Emerson – synthesizer; Rick Wakeman – synthesizer; Suzanne Ciani – synthesizer and piano lounge; Eumir Deodato – synthesizer; Pamelia Kurstin – theremin; NYC Reggae Collective – synthesizer; Bernie Worrell – synthesizer; DJ Logic – synthesizer; Stanley Jordan – synthesizer; Jason Miles – synthesizer; Steve Molitz of Particle – synthesizer; Graham Haynes – synthesizer; Joe Gallivan – synthesizer; Jordan Rudess – synthesizer; Maximum Grooves (the backing band): Jason Miles – keyboards; James Genus – bass; Sherrod Barnes – guitar; Andy Snitzer – saxophone; Gene Lake – drums; Horn section: Pam Fleming – trumpet; Dan Levine – trombone; Jenny Hill – saxophone

=== 2005 ===
The second Moogfest was a great success that was held at the B.B. King Blues Club & Grill in Times Square, Manhattan on Tuesday, May 31.

Line-up
- Edgar Winter
- Will Calhoun
- The Volt Per Octaves
- Adam Holzman
- Jordan Rudess
- Steve Molitz
- Brazilian Girls
- Eumir Deodato
- Don Preston Akashic Ensemble
- Chris Clark
- Gershon Kingsley
- DJ Logic

=== 2006 ===
The third Moogfest was held at B.B. King on Thursday, June 22. It was filmed and published in a documentary entitled, Moogfest 2006: Live.

Lineup	DVD track listing
Keith Emerson; Jan Hammer; Roger O'Donnell; Jordan Rudess; The Mahavishnu Project with Adam Holzman; Bernie Worrell; DJ Logic; The School of Rock	1. "Phat Overture: A. Prelude to Phat/B. Bending the Rules" Jordan Rudess; 2. "Insectsamongus" Jordan Rudess; 3. "Astrological" Bernie Worrell and DJ Logic; 4. "This Is a Story" Roger O'Donnell; 5. "Meeting of the Spirits"/"Dance of Maya" The Mahavishnu Project; 6. "Oh, Yeah?" Jan Hammer and The Mahavishnu Project; 7. "Darkness"/"Earth in Search of a Sun" Jan Hammer and The Mahavishnu Project; 8. "Flashback" Jan Hammer and The Mahavishnu Project; 9. "Blue Wind" Jan Hammer and The Mahavishnu Project; 10. "Led Boots" Jan Hammer and The Mahavishnu Project; 11. "Living Sin" Keith Emerson and his band 12. "Lucky Man" Keith Emerson and his band 13. "Tarkus" Keith Emerson and his band

=== 2007 ===
The fourth edition of Moogfest was held at B.B. King on Saturday, September 22. This was the last time that B.B. King held the festival.

Line-up
- Thomas Dolby
- Adam Holzman
- Don Preston
- Gershon Kingsley
- Herbert Deutsch
- T Lavitz
- Nail (Neil Alexander)
- Jordan Rudess
- Erik Norlander
- Spiraling
- Shueh-li Ong (Xenovibes)

=== 2008 ===
The fifth edition of Moogfest was held at the Hammerstein Ballroom in Manhattan Center on Monday, October 13. The event had a very poor turnout, and this was the last time that Moogfest was held in New York City and there was no Moogfest in 2009.

Lineup	Setlist
Umphrey's McGee; Eric McFadden Trio; Bernie Worrell; Aron Magner; Jamie Shields; Joe Russo; The Machine	The Machine (Pink Floyd tribute band); 1. "One of These Days"; 2. "Shine On You Crazy Diamond" (Parts V–VII); 3. "Set the Controls for the Heart of the Sun"; Prison Shank (Aron Magner, Joe Russo, Jamie Shields, and Ryan Stasik, joined by Jake Cinniger); 1. Improvisation; 2. Improvisation; 3. Improvisation; Eric McFadden Trio with Bernie Worrell; 1. "Flash Light" (with Paul Shaffer); 2. Unknown; 3. Unknown; 4. Unknown; Umphrey's McGee; 1. "Great American" – 11:21; 2. "Push the Pig" – 10:09; 3. "Hurt Bird Bath" – 13:20; 4. "End of the Road" – 3:23; 5. "Syncopated Strangers" – 9:41; 6. "Abacab" (with Jamie Shields) – 10:13

=== 2010 ===
The sixth edition of Moogfest was the first held in Asheville, and it was expanded to a three-day, multi-venue festival. It took place in five stages at places in downtown Asheville. The 2010 edition attracted 7,000 to 7,500 people a day. Devo were scheduled for Friday night at the Thomas Wolfe Auditorium, but the band could not perform because its guitarist, Bob Mothersbaugh, was injured. The 2010 edition was the first year the festival hosted films, panels, discussions, and workshops.

Moogfest 2010 lineup

Asheville Civic Center Arena
Friday, October 29	Saturday, October 30	Sunday, October 31
MGMT; Big Boi; Dan Deacon; Kuroma; Girl Talk	Massive Attack; Thievery Corporation; Caribou; Nosaj Thing; Shpongle: Simon Posford DJ Set	Pretty Lights; Younger Brother; Mimosa; Two Fresh

Thomas Wolfe Auditorium
Friday, October 29	Saturday, October 30	Sunday, October 31
~~Devo~~ (canceled); Clare & the Reasons; Van Dyke Parks; The Octopus Project; Panda Bear	The Disco Biscuits; Jónsi; School of Seven Bells; Mountain Man; Alex B	Hot Chip; Neon Indian; Sleigh Bells; Shout Out Out Out Out

The Orange Peel
Friday, October 29	Saturday, October 30	Sunday, October 31
RJD2; Mutemath; Nortec Collective Presents: Bostich & Fussible; Saturn Never Sleeps featuring King Britt and Rucyl; Dan Deacon	Dâm-Funk; Matmos; Emeralds; Projek Moog with Brian Kehew; Four Tet; The Volt Per Octaves with Bernie Worrell	EL-P; DJ Spooky; Omar Souleyman; Party Dark; Headtronics

Moogaplex
Friday, October 29	Saturday, October 30	Sunday, October 31
Paper Tiger; Lorn; Bonobo; DJ Bowie	Virtual Boy Jon Hopkins; Ikonika	Dâm-Funk; Gramatik; Michal Menert

Stella Blue
Friday, October 29	Saturday, October 30	Sunday, October 31
Javelin; Delicate Steve; Star Mountain	Pnuma Trio; Strut & Friends; RBTS Win	Thump; Marty Party; Mindelixir

Films and Workshops at Moogaplex and Fine Arts Theatre
Moogaplex		Fine Arts Theatre
Saturday, October 30	Sunday, October 31	Saturday, October 30	Sunday, October 31
Synth History Panel: Birth of the Mini Moog; Tara Busch Performance; Tech Panel: Moog Engineers; Theremin Performance and Lesson with Kevin Kissinger; Synth History Panel: Exploration of Bob Moog Archives; Moog Guitar Workshop: Sound Sculpting with Saul Zonana	Modern Day Sound Sculpting; Richard Devine: Abominatron; Synth History Panel: Examining the Legacy of Mini Synths; Theremin Performance and Lesson with Dorit Chrysler; The Power of Modular Synthesis	Bouncing Cats, a 2010 documentary film written and directed by Nabil Elderkin	Moog, a 2004 documentary film by Hans Fjellestad; Questions & Answers with Herb Deutsch and DJ Spooky

=== 2011 ===
The seventh edition of Moogfest was held on Halloween weekend. Brian Eno played a major role at Moogfest 2011, with his 77 Million Paintings exhibit and Illustrated Talk being the two most talked about events at the festival. Those who attended Eno's talk claimed that the discussion was "unexpectedly funny". Though still listed on the lineup, Glasser, Little Dragon, and Yacht were all unable to perform at the 2011 festival due to travel issues.

Moogfest 2011 lineup

Asheville Civic Center Arena
Friday, October 28	Saturday, October 29	Sunday, October 30
Moby; TV on the Radio; The Antlers; Holy Fuck	Sound Tribe Sector 9 Amon Tobin: ISAM; Tim Hecker; Yacht; SBTRKT	Special Disco Version featuring James Murphy and Pat Mahoney; Ghostland Observatory; M83; Active Child

Animoog Playground
Friday, October 28	Saturday, October 29	Sunday, October 30
Chromeo; ~~Little Dragon~~ (canceled); Mayer Hawthorne and The County; Matthew Dear	The Flaming Lips; Crystal Castles; The Naked and Famous; Dan Deacon	Passion Pit; Childish Gambino; Beats Antique; Sonmi

Thomas Wolfe Auditorium
Friday, October 28	Saturday, October 29	Sunday, October 30
Tangerine Dream; Flying Lotus; Beak; The Field	Terry and Gyan Riley; Battles; St. Vincent; Brian Eno's Illustrated Talk	Umphrey's McGee; Neon Indian; The Drums; ~~Glasser~~ (canceled)

Orange Peel
Friday, October 28	Saturday, October 29	Sunday, October 30
Anika; Zomby; Atlas Sound; Tobacco; Austra	Suicide; Twin Shadow; Toro Y Moi; Kode9; CANT	EOTO; Gold Panda; Emancipator; Oneohtrix Point Never; Fareed Haque with Mathgames

Diana Wortham Theatre
Friday, October 28	Saturday, October 29
Lunzproject featuring Hans-Joachim Roedelius and Tim Story; Mimi Goese and Ben Neill; Causing a Tiger; Shahzad Ismaily	Adrian Belew Power Trio; Stickmen; Wham City Comedy Tour; Hans-Joachim Roedelius

Fine Arts Theatre
Sunday, October 30
Live Film Scoring with Tara Busch

Asheville Music Hall
Thursday, October 27	Friday, October 28	Saturday, October 29	Sunday, October 30
Tobacco	AraabMuzik; Warm Ghost; Grimes; Fine Peduncle	Brandt Brauer Frick; Moon Duo; Cloudland Canyon; Marley Carroll	Savoy; Baths; John Maus; Ford & Lopatin

Moogaplex
Friday, October 28	Saturday, October 29	Sunday, October 30
Handmade Synth and Pedal Salon; Control Voltage - Modular Connectivity with the Moog Engineers; Convergence: Software and Hardware Integration in the 21st Century; Richard Devine hosts Animoog iPad Giveaway	Sound Design; Ableton + Moog = Platinum Record; Dan Deacon & Tara Busch's Moogerfooger Mayhem; Remembering Walter Sear's Pivotal Role in Moog Legacy	Pioneering Moog in Live Performance; Journey to the center of the Theremin with Neon Indian, Dorit Chrysler, and Albert Glinsky; Sun Ra and Beyond: Exploring Rare Recordings from Bob's Archives; Pioneering Moog from the Tech Perspective

YMI Cultural Center
October 28–30 – November 2–30
Brian Eno: 77 Million Paintings

=== 2012 ===
Moogfest 2012 lineup

ExploreAsheville.com Arena
Friday, October 26	Saturday, October 27
Pantha Du Prince; Nas; Primus 3D; Richie Hawtin	Divine Fits; Santigold; Orbital; Shpongle presents The Masquerade

Thomas Wolfe Auditorium
Friday, October 26	Saturday, October 27
Bear in Heaven; Miike Snow; Squarepusher; Explosions in the Sky	The Magnetic Fields; Thomas Dolby; Four Tet

The Orange Peel
Friday, October 26	Saturday, October 27
Killer Mike; El-P; Black Moth Super Rainbow; GZA presents Liquid Swords	"Moogfest Mashup"; Cold Cave; Death Grips; Carl Craig

Asheville Music Hall
Friday, October 26	Saturday, October 27
Wick-It the Instigator; Blondes; Ana Sia	Trust; Disclosure; Prefuse 73 with Teebs

Diana Wortham Theatre
Friday, October 26	Saturday, October 27
Buke and Gase; Morton Subotnik presents "From Silver Apples to a Sky of Cloudless Sulfur"; Exitmusic; Ahleuchatistas	"Creative Expression Through Interface" "Shaping Hits Through Moog Synths" "The Bob Moog Google Doodle: How A Pioneering Legacy Inspired Modern Innovation"; Julia Holter; Andy Stott; Tim Hecker & Daniel Lopatin; Harold Budd with Keith Lowe

=== 2014 ===
Moogfest 2014 was expanded to five days, and was held in Asheville from Wednesday, April 23 to Sunday, April 27.

Moogfest 2014 lineup (in alphabetical order by day)

Presenters / Speakers
Wednesday, April 23	Thursday, April 24	Friday, April 25	Saturday, April 26	Sunday, April 27
Bob Geolas; Dorit Chrysler; Odd Harmonics	Bradford Cox; Bruce Walker; Chuck Lightning; David Borden; Dorit Chrysler; Drew Blanke (Dr. Blankenstein); Felix Faire; Forrest M Mims III; Hans Fjellestad; Herbert Deutsch; Hisham Bharoocha; Janelle Monáe; Jay Silver; Jesse Hlebo; John Keston; Mark Frauenfelder; Nate "Rocket" Wonder; Neil Harbisson; Nick Zinner; Nicolas Collins; Professor Nick Bostrom; Scott Snibbe; Tom Oberheim; Tom Zimmermann; Yoon Chung Han; Yuri Suzuki	Andrew McPherson; Andy Cavatorta; Ben Bloomberg; Daedelus; Dave Smith; Dave Tompkins; Dorit Chrysler; Dr. Joseph Paradiso; Eric Rosenbaum; Gavin Russom; Giorgio Moroder; Gordon Reid; Gretta Cohn; Hisham Bharoocha; Jamin Warren; Jeff Crouse; Jerome C. Glenn; Jesse Hlebo; Karla Zimonja; Keith Emerson; Malcolm Cecil; Matt Boch; Matthew Lee Johnston; Robin Arnott; Roger Linn; William Kurth	Aaron Koblin; Alex Lieu; Alexander Chen; Charles Lindsay; Claire Evans; Cliff Martinez; Cyril Lance; Dan Deacon; Dave Tompkins; David Wexler (aka Dr. Strangeloop); Don Buchla; Dorit Chrysler; Douglas Vakoch; George Dvorsky; Greg Tate; Hisham Bharoocha; Jeff Crouse; Jesse Hlebo; Julia Kaganskiy; King Britt; Leon Hong; Martine Syms; Neal Reinalda; Peter Kirn; Raph Levien; Robert Fantinatto; Roger Linn; Ryan Germick; Sanford Biggers; Saul Williams	David X. Cohen; Don Buchla; Geert Bevin; Jeff Westbrook; Ken Keeler; Simon Singh; Stewart Burns

Performances
Wednesday, April 23	Thursday, April 24	Friday, April 25	Saturday, April 26	Sunday, April 27
C Powers; El-P; Flying Lotus; Nick Monaco; No Regular Play; Pet Shop Boys; Slow Hands; Soul Clap	ADULT. Aligning Minds; Art Department; Ataxia; Audion; Awesome Tapes From Africa; Bernie Worrell Orchestra; Black Dice; Clayton Steele; Com Truise; Dan Deacon; EATERS; Ejecta; Eric Volta; Green Velvet; Hello Hugo; Jimmy Edgar; Kraftwerk; Megafortress; Nitin; Noah Wall; NORTH AMERICANS; Sasha; Shigeto; Teengirl Fantasy; The Jellyrox; Tiga; Tin Foil Hat; Wolf Eyes; YACHT	Bottin; Clark - Phosphor Live; Daedelus; Darkstar; Dillon Francis; Earthtone Soundsystem; Egyptian Lover; Erika; Gent and Jawns; Giorgio Moroder; In Plain Sight; Keith Kemp; Kraftwerk; Kri & Sensoma; Lapalux; Metro Area; Mike Huckaby; Mike Simonetti; Mix Master Mike; Moderat; Patten; Razor and Blade; Reference - Live; Riff Raff; The Gaslamp Killer; Thugfucker; TOKiMONSTA; UR Presents: Timeline	Avey Tare's Slasher Flicks; Blondes; Body Games; Bombassic; Brett Rock; CHIC Feat. Nile Rodgers; Craig Leon - Nommos Live; DLX; Eliot Lipp; Escort; Factory Floor; Gordon Voidwell; Heads on Sticks; Hieroglyphic Being; Higher Learning; Holly Herndon; Kaytranada; Le1f; Les Sins; M.I.A; Machinedrum - Vapor City Live; Mark Farina; Marley Carroll; Museum of Love; Patten; Publicist; RBTS WIN; RJD2; Saul Williams; The Crystal Ark; The Volt Per Octaves; Two Fresh; Zeds Dead	High Klassified; Just Blaze; Nick Catchdubs; Salva; Sammy Bananas; Treasure Fingers

=== 2016 ===
The 2016 iteration of the festival moved locations, from Asheville to Durham, North Carolina. For the first time in 11 years, the festival was held on the weekend closest to Bob Moog's birthday, from May 19 to 22. Headliners included Grimes, Gary Numan, GZA, Laurie Anderson, Explosions in the Sky, Blood Orange, sunn O))), and Oneohtrix Point Never, with keynote speakers Dr. Martine Rothblatt and Jaron Lanier.

Moogfest 2016 lineup

21c Museum Hotel Main Ballroom
Thursday, May 19	Friday, May 20	Saturday, May 21	Sunday, May 22
Greg Fox: Durational Sound Installation 21C Presents: Robert Rich's Sleep Concert	"Acoustic Metamaterials" discussion w/ Steven A. Cummer (Duke University) EMA and Jana Hunter: Durational Sound Installation	"No Effects with Jesse Cohen" live podcast recording with Julia Holter and Empress Of Richard Devine: Durational Sound Installation	"Sound Interjection" discussion w/ Yuri Suzuki Suzanne Ciani: Durational Sound Installation

American Tobacco Campus
Saturday, May 21	Sunday, May 22
"Electronic Music for Children and Experimental Adults with DJ Lance Rock and Yo Gabba Gabba!" featuring DJ Nanny Cantaloupe, Bootsy Collins, Dorit Chrysler, Kate Stone, Malcolm Mooney, Mark Mothersbaugh, and Van Partible Reggie Watts	Modular on the Spot

American Underground @Main
Thursday, May 19	Friday, May 20	Saturday, May 21	Sunday, May 22
"The Art of the Video Game Soundtrack" discussion w/ Ghostdad and Patrick McDermott "The Future is Unmanned" discussion w/ Claire Evans	"Radical Radio" discussion w/ Shani Aviram, Justin Grotelueschen, Anna Friz, Jeff Kolar, and Kaitlin Prest "Creating Music Tech with Kickstarter" discussion w/ Nick Yulman "Mastery is Dead" discussion w/ Mike Butera	"Hacking Music: Rethinking Composition, Production & Experience Design" discussion w/ Jacob Gordon, Dave Rife & Gabe Liberti, Julia Kaganskiy, Kamil Nawratil, and Luisa Pereira "Spatial Sound & Subhistories" discussion w/ AUDINT, Kristen Gallerneaux, and Dave Tompkins	"Conductive Ink and Instruments" discussion w/ Kate Stone "Exploring Creativity with IDEO" discussion w/ Peter Hyer and Mike Butera

The Armory
Thursday, May 19	Friday, May 20	Saturday, May 21	Sunday, May 22
"Live Processing and Ghost Dancing" performance by Martin Brooke and Thomas F. DeFrantz of Duke University Moogfest 2016 VIP Opening Party w/ Laurel Halo (DJ set) Qrion UV boi Jlin Ryan Hemsworth	"Masterclass with Daniel Lanois and The Orb" discussion "Reggae Sound Systems and Dub Production" discussion w/ Angus Taylor, David Katz, Laurent "Tippy" Alfred, Mad Professor, Lister Hewan-Lowe, and Ras Kush Sam Aaron Kode9 Hieroglyphic Being Bicep (Live) Robert Hood The Black Madonna	"Masterclass: Daniel Lanois" discussion "Can You Remember the Future?" discussion w/ Janelle Monáe, Christian Rich, Reggie Watts, Chuck Lightning, Kimberly Drew, and Hieroglyphic Being "Wondaland Mystery Reveal" w/ Janelle Monáe, Chuck Lightning, and Greg Tate "Cognitive DJ Battle" performance by IBM Watson Earthly Actress The Orb DJ Harvey	"Masterclass: Ben Frost and Tim Hecker" discussion

Carolina Theatre, Cinema 1
Thursday, May 19	Friday, May 20	Saturday, May 21	Sunday, May 22
Lunar Orbit North American premiere screening and Q&A with Patrick Buchanan and The Orb	"The Future of Our Species" discussion w/ Neil Harbisson, Rich Lee, Daniel Lock, and BJ Murphy Song Exploder live podcast recording w/ ODESZA Gagglebox, The Silence, Zombies 1985 screening and live score by I Speak Machine	"Hidden Figures: Women & Afrofuturism" discussion w/ Kimberly Drew, Chuck Lightning, Janelle Monáe, and Allison Schroeder The Three Grace(s) triptych screening and live score by ADULT. and Dorit Chrysler	It Follows screening and discussion with Disasterpeace

Carolina Theatre, Fletcher Hall
Thursday, May 19	Friday, May 20	Saturday, May 21	Sunday, May 22
"Future Cities" discussion w/ Greta Byrum, Bob Geolas, Ben Johnson, and Wanona Satcher Dawn of Midi Julia Holter Arthur Russell's Instrumentals Directed by Peter Gordon Daniel Lanois	"The Future of Creativity" keynote speech by Dr. Martine Rothblatt "Time Traveling with Hip Hop" discussion w/ GZA and Mark Anthony Neal Rival Consoles Alessandro Cortini Grouper Gary Numan (performing The Pleasure Principle)	"The Future of Creativity" keynote speech by Jaron Lanier "The Language of the Future" performance by Laurie Anderson Gary Numan (performing Telekon) Ben Frost Tim Hecker Oneohtrix Point Never Explosions in the Sky	Laurie Anderson in Conversation w/ Jana Hunter

Durham Arts Council PSI Theatre
Thursday, May 19	Friday, May 20	Saturday, May 21	Sunday, May 22
"IBM Watson 101: Introduction to Cognitive Tech." "A Cyborg's Synaesthetic Pedicure" performance by Neil Harbisson and Pau Riba "Musical Language, Musical Brains" discussion w/ Onyx Ashanti	"Human-Centered Smart Environments: How Close Can We Get to the Holodeck?" discussion w/ R. Benjamin Knapp (Virginia Tech ICAT) "Technoshamanism: A Very Psychedelic Century!" discussion w/ Michael Garfield "Seismic Performance" by Moon Ribas "Celebrating the Work of Don Buchla" performance by Alessandro Cortini, Richard Smith, Suzanne Ciani, Morton Subotnick, and Sarah Davachi	"The Improvising Robotic Marimba Player" performance/discussion w/ Gil Weinberg & Shimon "Arts & Smarts with Google Doodle's Ryan Germick", Emma Coats, and Scott McCloud Olivia Block Mac McCaughan Tyondai Braxton	"Hyperinstruments, Robotic Operas, and City Symphonies" discussion w/ Tod Machover "Arts & Smarts with Google Doodle's Ryan Germick", Susan Kare, and Manuel Clement "Google Brain: Magenta" discussion w/ Douglas Eck, Adam Florin, Adam Roberts, Gil Weinberg & Shimon, and Tobias Overath, PhD (Duke University)

First Presbyterian Church
Saturday, May 21
Gwenno

Daniel Bachman

Moses Sumney

Julianna Barwick

Julia Holter

Full Frame Theater
Thursday, May 19	Friday, May 20	Saturday, May 21	Sunday, May 22
"Synth Design Icon" discussion w/ David Friend Kabbalistic Synthesizer Performance and Masterclass by Sam Conran	"The Wifi Whisperer: A Conversation" w/ Kyle McDonald and Surya Mattu "Think It / Make It - Crowdfunding and Micro-Manufacturing for Musical Devices" discussion w/ Andrew Kilpatrick "Polyrhythmic Loops with 4MS" discussion w/ Dan Green "Synth Design Icon" discussion w/ Tatsuya Takahashi "Interactive Spatialization of Sound" discussion w/ Ivica Ico Bukvic (Virginia Tech ICAT) "The Well-Sequenced Synthesizer: Exploring Music Through Interactive Design and Computation" discussion w/ Luisa Pereira (NEW INC)	"Sensory Percussion and The Future of Drumming" demonstration w/ Greg Fox, Ian Chang and Tlacael Esparza "No Coast Synthesis: How to Follow the Arrows" discussion w/ Tony Tolando and Walker Farrell of Make Noise "Synth Design Icon" discussion w/ Cyril Lance Kabbalistic Synthesizer Performance and Masterclass by Sam Conran	"The Artiphon INSTRUMENT 1: Theory and demonstration" w/ Mike Butera "Small Scale Analog and Digital Synthesizers with Bleep Labs" discussion w/ John-Mike Reed "Sunhouse & Ian Chang of Son Lux" performance

Motorco Music Hall
Thursday, May 19	Friday, May 20	Saturday, May 21
The Range Jaakko Eino Kalevi Silver Apples Zombi Gary Numan (performing Replicas)	Professor Toon Well$ Daye Jack Denzel Curry Lunice Tory Lanez GZA	Shallou Demo Taped Son Lux YACHT Christian Rich ~~Mykki Blanco~~

Motorco Park
Thursday, May 19	Friday, May 20	Saturday, May 21
DJ Craig Layabout Hundred Waters Floating Points (Live) Blood Orange Miike Snow	HEALTH Bob Moses Grimes ODESZA	Made of Oak Empress Of Sunn O))) D∆WN GZA

The Pinhook
Thursday, May 19	Friday, May 20	Saturday, May 21
Ultrabillions (DJ set) Larry Gus RABIT Afrikan Sciences Paula Temple	Party Illegal DJs Eyes Low Hanz Trandle M. Geddes Gengras Patricia Kyle Hall (DJ set) Darwin (DJ set)	RBTS WIN The Body Quintron & Miss Pussycat Veronica Vasicka Laurel Halo Karen Gwyer Via App Heathered Pearls

=== 2017 ===
The 2017 edition of the festival was held May 18 to 21. The performance lineup was announced March 7 and included Flying Lotus, Animal Collective, Suzanne Ciani, Derrick May, Gotye (performing a tribute to the late Jean-Jacques Perrey), Talib Kweli, 808 State, Jessy Lanza, Simian Mobile Disco, Moor Mother, Syrinx, Visible Cloaks, Mykki Blanco, Princess Nokia, Omar Souleyman, S U R V I V E (who performed a live rendition of their score to the series Stranger Things), and many more. Many of the performers also participated in daytime programming, such as workshops and discussions.

=== 2018 ===
Moogfest 2018 was held on May 17 to 20 in Durham, North Carolina. The lineup included an appearance by Chelsea Manning and stressed "female, non-binary, and transgender artists". This generated some controversy, with Caroline Polachek choosing to pull out of the lineup.

== Engineering Workshop ==
Beginning in 2014, Engineer VIP Pass holders participated in Engineering Workshops (also advertised as Synth-Building Workshops). Participants received a kit for an unreleased Moog product and constructed it under the guidance of Moog engineers over the course of the festival. Some of these products went on to retail release, while others remain Moogfest exclusives.

=== Workshop Kits ===
- Moog Werkstatt-Ø1 (2014)
- Moog BFAM (Brother From Another Mother) (2016)
- Moog DFAM (Drummer From Another Mother) (2017)
- Moog Subharmonicon (2018)
- Moog Spectravox (2019)

== Moog Innovation Award ==
The Moog Innovation Award, introduced since the third edition of the festival in 2006, celebrates "pioneering artists whose genre-defying work exemplifies the bold, innovative spirit of Bob Moog".

Year	Recipient
2006	Keith Emerson and Jan Hammer
2007	Herb Deutsch and Gershon Kingsley
2008	Bernie Worrell
2010	Devo
2011	Brian Eno
2012	Thomas Dolby
2016	Gary Numan
2017	Suzanne Ciani
2018	Bernie Krause
2019	Martin Gore

== See also ==
- Robert Moog
- Bob Moog Foundation
- Moog Music
- Moog synthesizer
- Minimoog
- Moog
- Mountain Oasis Electronic Music Summit (2013)
- List of electronic music festivals

== Notes ==
=== References ===
Books

- Holmes, Thom (2002). Electronic and Experimental Music: Pioneers in Technology and Composition. New York; London: Routledge. ISBN 0-415-93643-8. OCLC 49786143.

Films and documentaries

- Fjellestad, Hans (Director); Robert Moog, Charlie Clouser, Herbert Deutsch, Keith Emerson, Rick Wakeman, Bernie Worrell, Woody Jackson, Edd Kalehoff, Gershon Kingsley, Pamelia Kurstin, DJ Logic, Money Mark, Mix Master Mike, Jean-Jacques Perrey, Walter E. Sear, DJ Spooky, Luke Vibert (2004). Moog (Motion picture, DVD). ZU33; Plexi Film. OCLC 654748937.
- Jordan Rudess, Roger O'Donnell, Bernie Worrell, DJ Logic. Jan Hammer, Keith Emerson (June 5, 2007). Moogfest 2006: Live (MP4) (DVD). Oaks, PA: MVD Visual. OCLC 173259968.
  - "Various Artists: MoogFest 2006 (DVD)". Review. Sea of Tranquility.

News, magazines, journals and papers

- Belleme, Mike (November 1, 2010). "Honoring the Moment When Music Met Moog". The New York Times.
- Forsythe, Dana (October 5, 2011). "MoogFest 2011: Musical Innovation, Creation and Creativity in Carolina". Morning Sun. Pittsburg, KS: GateHouse Media.
- Ganz, Jacob (October 30, 2011). "Brian Eno: Mayor of Moogfest". NPR Music.
- Kiss, Tony (October 27, 2011). "Moogfest: What to Know about Asheville's electronic music festival". Citizen Times.
- Marshall, Alli (November 2, 2011). "Brian Eno's 77 Million Paintings opens to the public today". Mountain Xpress. Asheville, NC: Jeff Fobes.
- Miller, Abby (October 24, 2011). "Headstash's MOOGFEST Preview Guide". Headstash.
- Moog, Robert A. (July 1965). "Voltage-Controlled Electronic Music Modules". Journal of the Audio Engineering Society. 13 (3). New York, New York: Audio Engineering Society: 200–206.
- Sandford, Jason (October 31, 2011). "Weekend of Moogfest in downtown Asheville a wrap". Citizen Times.
- Shachtman, Noah (May 20, 2004). "Is a Moog Renaissance Nigh?". Wired. United States: Condé Nast.
- Steuer, Eric (October 2011). "Musicians and Fans Descend on Second Annual Moogfest". Wired. United States: Condé Nast.
- Warren, Sabian (November 1, 2011). "Moogfest Totals at least 30 arrests".
- "Electronic music pioneer Moog dies at 71". PakTribune. August 23, 2005.
- "(MOOGFEST IN NEW YORK CITY) BB King's Blues Club???". The New York Times. October 9, 2008.
- "Synthesiser pioneer Dr Moog dies". BBC News. London, England. August 22, 2005.

Web resources

- Altman, Roger C. (2009) [January/February]. "The Great Crash". Foreign Affairs. Archived from the original on February 23, 2009.
- Crawford, Franklin (August 23, 2005). "Robert Moog, Ph.D. '64, inventor of the music synthesizer, dies of brain cancer". Cornell University News Service.
- Dawson, Eric (May 18, 2004). "Moogfest 2011: OMG! Just met Brian Eno!!! #diehappynow". Tiny Mix Tapes.
- Emerson, Keith (May 18, 2004). "Photos - 18 May 2004 - MoogFest". Official Website. Archived from the original on March 12, 2016.
- Gordon, Jeremy; Carla Danca (October 15, 2008). "Picture Show: Moogfest 2008". Hidden Track.
- Kirn, Peter (May 18, 2005). "Moogfest: Moog Music Blowout in NYC – Lineup Details". Create Digital Music.
- Lewis, Mick (September 29, 2011). "An Electrifying Journey: Origin of a Music Festival Celebrating Innovator Bob Moog". Brooklyn, NY: The Tuned Inn.
- Smith, Wayne; Rick Wakeman. "News - August 2004". RWCC.
- "Brian Eno: 77 Million Paintings". Mooogfest. 2011.
- "EVENTS". Carlini Group.
- "The Mind-Blowing, Mysterious, Moogfest: Festival Recap". NPR. November 1, 2011.
- "Moogfest" (PHP). AC Entertainment.
- "Moogfest 2004". MusicbyCybertron.com.
- "Moogfest 2004". Brooklin, NY: The Tuned Inn.
- "Moogfest 2005". Brooklin, NY: The Tuned Inn.
- "Moogfest 2006". Brooklin, NY: The Tuned Inn.
- "Moogfest 2007". Brooklin, NY: The Tuned Inn.
- "Moogfest 2008". Brooklin, NY: The Tuned Inn.
- "Moogfest 2010". Brooklin, NY: The Tuned Inn.
- "Moogfest 2010 Lineup". Stereogum. August 10, 2010.
- "Moogfest Panels & Discussions Captivate Audiences, Illuminate Moog Legacy". Bob Moog Foundation. November 5, 2010.
- "MoogFest Moog Clinic with Keith Emerson & Bob Moog, May 17, 2004 / The Keith Emerson Band, B.B. Kings, May 21, 2004". Aural-Innovations.com.
- "Moogfest's daily lineup, expanded venues and more!". Bob Moog Foundation. September 22, 2011.
- "Lineup 2010". Mooogfest. 2010.
  - "Events: Friday, October 29, 2010". Mooogfest. 2010.
  - "Events: Saturday, October 30, 2010". Mooogfest. 2010.
  - "Events: Sunday, October 31, 2010". Mooogfest. 2010.
  - "Workshops and Films: 30–31 October 2010". Mooogfest. 2010.
- "Lineup 2011". Mooogfest. 2011.
  - "Events: Thursday, October 27, 2011". Mooogfest. 2011.
  - "Events: Friday, October 28, 2011". Mooogfest. 2011.
  - "Events: Saturday, October 29, 2011". Mooogfest. 2011.
  - "Events: Sunday, October 30, 2011". Mooogfest. 2011.
- "Moogfest 2011 Announces Panel Details, and Schedule". Altsounds.com. October 20, 2011.
- "Moogfest 2011: Inside the Moog Factory". Moog Music.
- "Overview". Moogfest.
  - "Overview (2010)". Moogfest.
- "3rd Annual Moogfest Breaks New Ground: Bob Moog Fund for Electronic Music announced, Keith Emerson and Jan Hammer honored, Little Phatty debut performance". Sonicstate.com. June 28, 2006.
- "Synth Art Show (2011)". Moogfest.
- "Suzanne Ciani: Concert". Sevwave.com. May 18, 2004.
- "Venues". Moogfest.
  - "Venues (2010)". Moogfest.
