= Shueh-li Ong =

- Origin: Melbourne Australia
- Genres: Electronic, jazz fusion, synthpop, progressive rock, classical, singer-songwriter, soundtrack
- Occupations: synthesist, thereminist, composer, producer
- Instruments: Theremin, synthesizers, tin-whistle, guqin, voice
- Website: shuehli.com

Shueh-li Ong is an Australian born composer, producer, arranger and multi-instrumentalist (thereminist, synthesizer, sound designer, performer and vocalist). She has been residing in the U.S. since 2005, and is currently based in Nashville, TN.

Ong is regarded as a world-renown thereminist whose playing features on “Hurry Up and Smell the Roses” the 2012 solo album by Tom Brislin, and on album La Conquista del Espacio by Fito Páez which won the 2021 Grammy for Best Latin Rock or Alternative Album, and the 2020 Latin Grammy for Best Pop/Rock Album.

== Education ==
Ong was a student of piano with Stefan Ammer and of electronic music with Tristram Cary while enrolled in a Bachelor of Music degree at the Elder Conservatorium of Music, University of Adelaide in Australia. She also acquired a Graduate Diploma in Contemporary Music Technology from La Trobe University, Australia, before undertaking postgraduate research under the mentorship of Dr Jeff Pressing; musician, academic, psychologist and The Age music critic. Her area of research was in interactive multimedia techniques, which involved 2D-3D computer animation, generative music and extended synth techniques in live virtuosic performance.

== Music career and the theremin ==
Ong considered the theremin after reaching a juncture in her development as a musician. She had left a position as head of marketing and game development lead with a Singapore company, to direct a music and technology show design company, Electric Muse. She wanted to incorporate other languages and musics into her work. She picked the theremin to represent the history of electronic musical instruments; and to complement other instruments that represented the different facets of her musical and cultural heritage.

Electric Muse was formed in Singapore with friend and associate, Michael Spicer; Ong as business development manager/composer and Spicer as consultant. In 1999, Electric Muse produced its first full-length performance, A Tale Of Metal And Music, in the Singapore Arts Festival Fringe's Late Night Series. This was followed by its sequel, Timega Theory, performed at the Melbourne Fringe Festival, Australia in 2000, then in Singapore in 2001. During this period, Ong also composed for theatre companies; Theatreworks’ production On Mercury’s Wings, and The Necessary Stage’s production Spoilt. Ong performed with Spicer for the former production, and solo in the latter.

After a few years working in theatrical productions and staged concerts, Ong was confronted by requests for her music on CD. So she assembled Shueh-li's Xenovibes; a collection of her eclectic compositions in this first album. Xenovibes mingled Ong’s Asian and Western musical influences in a personal style shaped by her classical and electronic music training in studio and live performance. Ong was joined by Dallas-based drummer John Martinez, Australian keyboardist Michael Spicer, and Singaporean guitarist Jeff Long, at the premier of Shueh-li’s Xenovibes the Show in Singapore on 8 May 2004. Singaporean daily English-language newspaper, The Straits Times, proclaimed Ong as Singapore's first and only diva of the theremin; and a producer, performer, concert administrator and artist all rolled into one. Xenovibes officially became an electronic group thereafter.

== Move to America ==
In 2005, Ong moved to the U.S.A. on a special visa awarded to an Alien of extraordinary ability with the specific purpose of creating new music, working on shows and touring. Martinez joined as core member of Xenovibes U.S.A. Xenovibes made its US debut at the Dallas Museum of Art’s 102nd birthday production. Ong was accompanied by Martinez, Mike McKinney (The_Jacksons_Live!), and Shelley Carrol (Duke Ellington Orchestra) in an ensemble of six.

With Martinez, Ong also co-directed a music academy in the United States.

Ong moved from Dallas to Nashville in 2010 to take in new sights and sound, and to retreat to record new music.

Ong has been interviewed about her work as a record producer, and as a performer, and how she designs from a macro perspective, modulating the theremin with distortion, flanging and heavy delay. Her four albums have received praise around the world for their production value, along with her contributions in the development of new theremin performances. Musicians who have appeared on her albums include Dean Parks, Curtis Randall, and Tom Brislin.

Ong is possibly the first thereminist to have performed at the Dallas Museum of Art (2005), Grapevine Opry (2008), State Fair of Texas (2007), NJProghouse (2013), and the Steinway Piano Gallery Nashville (2012), and the second at Moogfest (2007).

== Inverted volume antenna customised by Bob Moog ==
Ong plays her Etherwave and Epro theremins that were customized by Bob Moog to have the volume antenna inverted. During a photoshoot the E-Pro toppled leading to its volume antenna being damaged. As Bob Moog did not leave any blueprints, Moog Music had to reverse engineer it with hopes they could fix it.

== Journalistic Activities ==
Ong has been a contributor to the Singapore Arts Magazine, and South-east Asian music blog, Sonicfreakz. She is host of youtube livestream “Music and Chat” sharing the behind-the-scenes work of inventors, concept artists, VFX supervisors, composers, synthesists, magazine editors, hit writers and more. “Music and Chat” aired its 1st episode in May 2020 with its initial goal to stay in touch with friends and fans during the pandemic.

Peter Zinovieff, Trevor Pinch, Herb Deustch and Beegie Adair each made one of their last public appearances on this livestream.

== Discography ==
=== Singles ===
- 2021 Jan 2 Together
- 2020 Oct The Universe
- 2017 May 17 Delight
- 2017 Oct 27 Jeune et Animée
- 2013 Jan 1 Thriller (cover)
- 2012 May 28 My Summertime Dreams
- 2012 March 22 Ice Rain
- 2011 August 8 A Working Title
- 2011 June 14 Leave Me In Stasis (Guest appearance by Tom Brislin on piano)
- 2011 May 23 Deja vu-Love voodoo
- 2010 Dec 9 I'm leaving you a message

=== Albums ===
- 2024 June 29 MissOriented Metaphor (aka The Concerto)
- 2012 Aug 4 A Working Title - special edition
- 2009 *Xing Paths (arranged and produced, released under Xenovibes)
- 2007 Music From Another Land (released under Xenovibes)
- 2004 Shueh-li’s Xenovibes the Premier DVD
- 2003 Shueh-li’s Xenovibes

=== Other Recordings ===
- 2020 Fito Páez - La Conquista Del Espacio CD [theremin on track La Canción de las Bestias]
- 2017 3RDegree - Ones & Zeros: Volume 0 CD (theremin)
- 2014 Indie film - Thong Girl vs Xolta from Outer Space Thong Girl Vs Xolta from Outer Space (theremin)
- 2014 Little Dipper - Last Broadcast CD (theremin)
- 2012 Tom Brislin - Hurry Up And Smell The Roses CD (theremin, synthesizer, engineer)
- 2007 Robert Casteels - Taman Suara 2. Pontianak (theremin)

== Original Shows/Live Performance Credits ==
- 1999 Metal and Music - Electronic Opera by Ong. Singapore Arts Festival. Also appearing Michael Spicer of Redgum Australia.
- 2000 Timega Theory - Electronic Opera by Ong. Melbourne Arts Festival. Also appearing Michael Spicer.
- 2001 Timega Theory - Electronic Opera by Ong. National University of Singapore. Also appearing Michael Spicer.
- 2004 Shueh-li’s Xenovibes - Singapore. Guest appearance by drummer John Anthony Martinez and guitarist Jeff Long.
- 2005 Shueh-li’s Xenovibes - Dallas TX. Guest appearance by bassist Mike McKinney and wind-player Shelley Carrol (Duke Ellington Orchestra.)
- 2005 Xenovibes Fall05 Tour (Dallas TX) - Dallas Museum of Art, Palace Theater and Eisemann Center. Guest appearances by bassist Chuck Smith and guitarist Bill Ham (Bread (band))
- 2006 Water Tower’s ‘Out of the Loop Festival’. Guest appearances by bassist George Anderson (Shakatak) and Bill Ham.
- 2007 Club Dada, Liquid Lounge, Amsterdam Bar - Dallas TX. Guest appearance by Bernard Wright.
- 2007 Moogfest - B B King, NYC, USA.
- 2007 State Fair of Texas - USA.
- 2008 EtherMusicFest - Asheville NC, USA.
- 2008 Return to Singapore Tour. Guest appearance by keyboardist ‘Face’.
- 2008 Grapevine Opry's 21st Anniversary Show, USA.
- 2010 Singapore Esplanade (Flipside). Together with the Artsylum Quartet.
- 2012 Steinway Piano Gallery (CD release concert). Guest appearance by Beegie Adair, Elisabeth Small and Tom Brislin.
- 2013 NJ Proghouse Progressive Music Series.
- 2014 Steinway Piano Gallery Nashville. "Shueh-li Presents".
- 2014 Switched On : Birth of the Moog Synth exhibit - History Ctr, Ithaca NY
- 2015 Steinway Piano Gallery Nashville. "Shueh-li Presents". Guest appearance by Eric Struthers (Aaron Neville Quartet)
- 2015 Moog Birthday Bash - History Ctr, Ithaca NY. Also appearing Malcolm Cecil, David Borden, Herb Deutsch, Trevor Pinch.

== Original Music (and Performance) ==
- 1999 TheatreWorks (Singapore) "On Mercury's Wings"- Singapore.
- 2001 The Necessary Stage "Spoilt" - Singapore.
- 2003 International Computer Music Conference - Singapore.
