= AC Entertainment =

Music promoter based in Knoxville, Tennessee

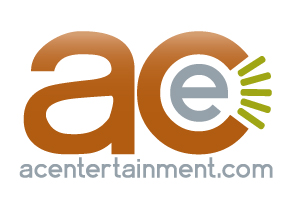
- Type: Private
- Industry: Entertainment
- Founded: 1991
- Founder: Ashley Capps
- Headquarters: Knoxville, TN
- Area served: U.S.: Southeast and nationwide
- Services: Event Production; Talent Buying; Festival/Event Consulting; Theatre Management
- Website: http://www.acentertainment.com/

AC Entertainment is a music promotion company based in Knoxville, Tennessee. They are the co-producers of the Bonnaroo Music & Arts Festival with Superfly Productions and the producers of the WayHome Music & Arts in Barrie, ON, the Forecastle Festival in Louisville, KY, Big Ears Festival in Knoxville, TN, and the Mountain Oasis Electronic Music Summit in Asheville, NC. They also specialize in venue management and services, event booking and production and event marketing and sponsorships. They are also talent-buyers for several venues across the Southeast.

AC Entertainment maintains the Great Stage Park festival ground, where they annually host Bonnaroo. They produce and promote a variety of music and performing arts events across the country with an emphasis on the Southeast. The company was also involved in starting the alternative weekly Metro Pulse, although the two companies are now independent.

AC Entertainment is headed by Ashley Capps, who founded the company in 1991. Capps got his start as a music promoter in Knoxville during the 1970s, where he booked events at the University of Tennessee and off-campus venues. In 1988 he opened a music club in Knoxville called Ella Guru's, which he closed in 1990 to re-focus his energies on forming AC Entertainment.

== Festivals ==
=== Bonnaroo (2002-present) ===
Bonnaroo is a four-day music festival held at Great Stage Park on a 750-acre farm in Manchester, TN. The main attractions of the festival are the multiple stages of live music, which feature a diverse array of musical styles including indie rock, folk, hip hop, Americana, reggae, electronica and more.

=== Forecastle (2002-present) ===
A three-day music, art and environmental activism festival held in Louisville, Kentucky. The festival began as a small gathering of local musicians in Louisville's Tyler Park and steadily grew into a national attraction that now includes major touring acts, national art collectives, outdoor industry partners, prominent speakers, environmental workshops, and more. Forecastle was selected in 2012 as one of Rolling Stone's "Top 33 Coolest Festivals" and has an annual attendance of over 65,000 fans at Louisville Waterfront Park.

=== WayHome (2015-present) ===
In 2015, AC Entertainment announced their partnership with Canadian promoter/producer Republic Live to produce the inaugural WayHome Music and Arts Festival, a three-day music and arts festival set for July 24–26 at Burl's Creek Event Grounds near Barrie, Ontario. Blare Magazine called the festival "a new experience that no one will ever regret or forget."

=== Big Ears (2009-2010, 2014-present) ===
Brainchild of Ashley Capps, Big Ears was an annual music festival in Knoxville, TN created and produced by AC Entertainment, considered an avant-garde boutique festival that took place in historic locations around downtown Knoxville. Though the festival did not occur from 2011 to 2013, its return was announced on October 23, 2013 and it continues into present day. In 2016, The Guardian declared the event "surely America’s (the world’s?) most thrillingly diverse festival lineup."

=== Sloss Music & Arts Festival (2015-2018) ===
In 2015, AC Entertainment announced their partnership with Birmingham promoter/producer Red Mountain Entertainment to produce the Sloss Music and Arts Festival, a two-day music and arts festival to take place in July at the historic Sloss Furnaces. The event was held up until the 2018 calendar year.

=== Mountain Oasis (2013) ===
Mountain Oasis Electronic Music Summit was an electronic music festival held in Asheville, North Carolina in 2013. Woven around the twin threads of contemporary electronic music and the creative use of technology – old and new – the festival featured musical performances by artists in contemporary music along with talks, seminars, and panels by artists and others; interactive experiences for audiences; art installations and exhibitions; and more. After parting ways with the name the Bob Moog Foundation following the 2012 iteration of Moogfest, Mountain Oasis Electronic Summit occurred as a spiritual successor in 2013, with artists like Nine Inch Nails, Bassnectar, Pretty Lights, and Neutral Milk Hotel.

=== Other festivals ===
AC Entertainment has also worked on Vegoose in Las Vegas, Nevada (2005-2007), as well as Sundown in the City in Knoxville, Tennessee, and AFROPUNK ATL in Atlanta, Georgia.
