= Envelope (music) =

Change of sound over time

In sound and music, an envelope describes how a sound changes over time. For example, a piano key, when struck and held, creates a near-immediate initial sound which gradually decreases in volume to zero. An envelope may relate to elements such as amplitude (volume), frequency (with the use of filters) or pitch.

Envelope generators, which allow users to control the different stages of a sound, are common features of synthesizers, samplers, and other electronic musical instruments. The most common envelope generator is controlled with four parameters: attack, decay, sustain and release (ADSR).

== Development ==
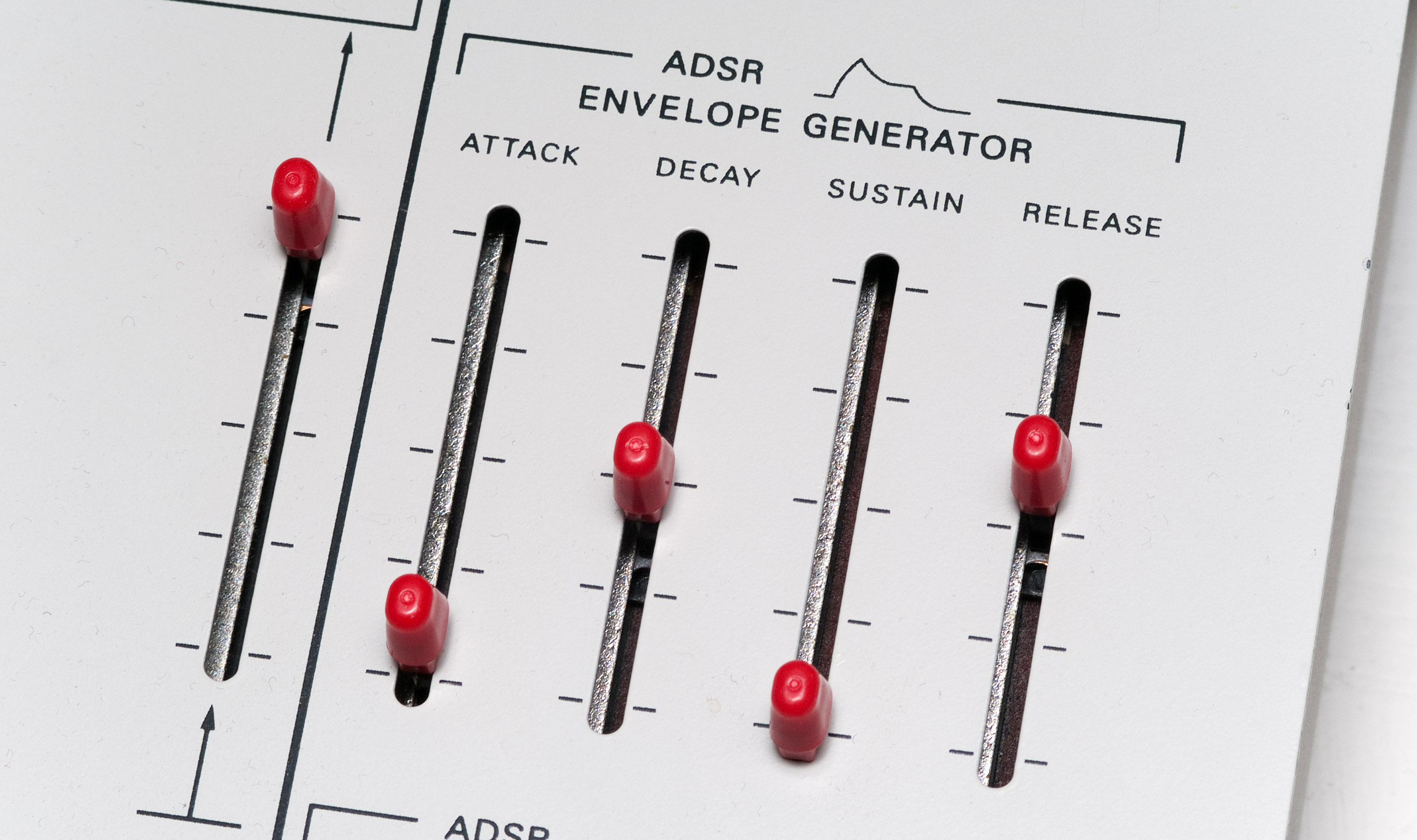
The ADSR envelope controls of a Korg ARP Odyssey synthesizer

The envelope generator was created by the American engineer Robert Moog, the creator of the Moog synthesizer, in the 1960s. The composer Herbert Deutsch suggested Moog find a way to articulate his synthesizer so notes did not simply trigger on and off. Moog wired a doorbell button to the synthesizer and used a capacitor to store and slowly release voltage produced from hitting a key. He refined the design to remove the need to push a separate button with every keypress, with two switches on every key: one to produce the control voltage determining pitch and the other to trigger the envelope generator. The envelope generator became a standard feature of synthesizers.

Following discussions with the engineer and composer Vladimir Ussachevsky, the head of the Columbia-Princeton Electronic Music Center, in 1965, Moog developed a new envelope module with the parameters T1 (attack time), T2 (initial decay time), ESUS (sustain level), and T3 (final decay time). These were later simplified to the modern ADSR form (attack time, decay time, sustain level, release time) by ARP.

== ADSR ==
Schematic of ADSR

The most common kind of envelope generator has four stages: attack, decay, sustain, and release (ADSR).

- Attack is the time taken for the level to rise from nil to peak.
- Decay is the time taken for the level to reduce from peak to the sustain level.
- Sustain is the level maintained until the key is released.
- Release is the time taken for the level to decay to nil.

== Other envelopes ==
Some systems use only attack or release stages, or add additional stages. The Korg MS-20 adds a "hold" stage, which can be used to sustain a note after releasing a key, similarly to a sustain pedal. It also adds a "delay" stage, which allows the user to set a time before the envelope initiates. Yamaha created an envelope that removes the sustain stage and adds "initial" and "after" steps for the attack.

== See also ==
- Envelope (waves)
- Envelope detector
