= Lisa Bella Donna =

American electronic music composer and multi-instrumentalist

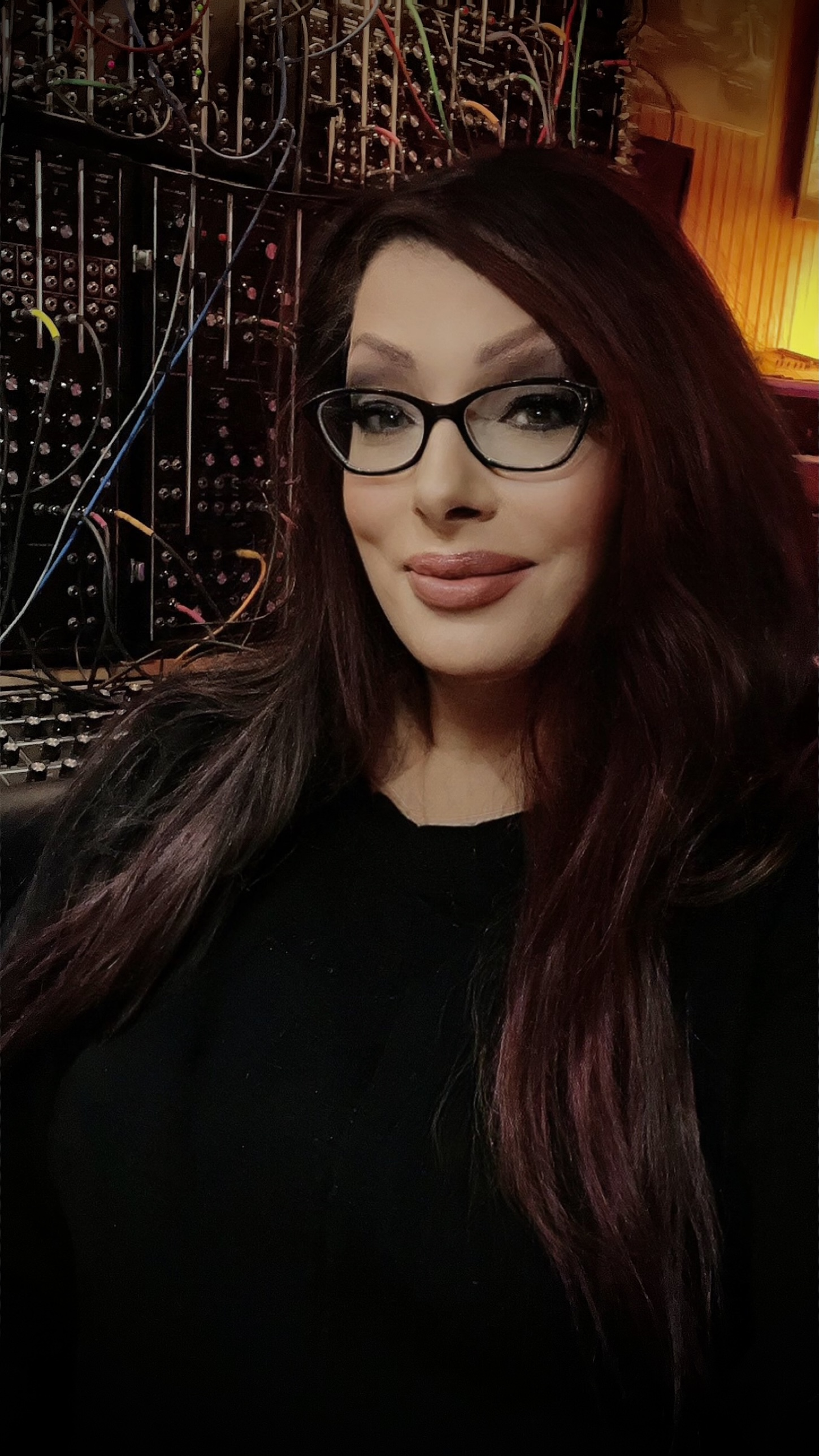

Background information
- Genres: Avant-garde; Electro-Acoustic; Electronic; Experimental
- Instruments: modular synthesizer; synthesizer
- Website: https://lisabelladonna.com

Lisa Bella Donna is an American musician and composer known for her use of modular synthesizers.

== Career ==
Bella Donna released her first solo work in 1994. In 2019, she released 10 full-length albums, which she has described as an "instant composition" approach to reflect the nature of the live performances. In 2019, she also released a four-way split with Boris, Relaxer, and Crypt City, with a brief tour in Japan. By mid-2021, she had released 25 albums. According to Dave Segal of The Stranger, "her Bandcamp is full of outstanding releases", referring to her collection of works released on Bandcamp, and her "arsenal includes some of the most glorious-sounding instruments in the electronic-music spectrum: ARP 2600, ARP String Ensemble, Moog One, and Moog Modular System."

Bella Donna is one of the featured artists interviewed for the 2020 book PATCH & TWEAK with Moog by Kim Bjørn. She is a Moog Music representative, was featured in a 2019 promotional video for the Matriarch synthesizer, and has demonstrated Moog instruments in a 2019 video for Reverb.

Her home recording studio, Appalachian Recording, is based in the Appalachians.

== Discography ==
Lisa Bella Donna discography
- Studio albums: 35
- Live albums: 1

- Snowy Dreamscapes (1994, Imperial Emporium, ARP Foundation)
- Tell Me What You Feel (1996, Rolling Hills Records)
- Wilderness (2001, Translucent Noel Recordings)
- The Changing World (2002, Translucent Noel Recordings)
- Skylines (2016, Secret Studio Records)
- The Haunting Of October Dreams (2018)
- Omnipresence (2018)
- Next Time Around (2018)
- Sounddrones Vol I & II (w Stan Smith, 2017 SSP)
- Moments of a Journey (w Stan Smith) (2018, SSP)
- Two Nights in February (w Stan Smith) (2018, SSP)
- Endless Roads (2019)
- Live (2019)
- Circulus (2019)
- Convergence (Anthology) (2019)
- Destinations (2019)
- Afternoon Dreams (2019)
- Tramontane (2019)
- Night Shift (2019)
- Take My Hand, Come with Me (2019, Music District)
- Changin' Times (2020, Acusca Records)
- ESP (2020)
- Night Flight (MOOG Music Inc.)
- Cheyenne Crossing (2020, Monolith On the Mesa)
- Orchards Of Churchyard Departures (2020)
- December's Pentacle (2020)
- Tintinnabulation (2021)
- Sonata For Loudspeakers (2020)
- Pilgrimage (2020)
- Electronic Studies (2021)
- Nyctophilia (2020)
- Odyssey (2020, Live Acts Argentina Records)
- Afterimages (2020)
- The World She Wanted (2021, Behind the Sky Records)
- Turning Point (2021, Metrograph Films)
- Ascension (2021, MOOG Music Inc.)
- Mourning Light (2021, Behind the Sky Records)
- October Voyages (2021)
- Appalachian Wilderness (2021, Behind the Sky Records)
- Moogmentum (2021, Behind the Sky Records / Bob Moog Foundation)
- Revel In Time (Anthony Arjen Luccason's Star One) (2022, Inside Out Records)
- American Watercolors (2022)
- Electronic Voyages (2022)
- Photophobia (2022)
- Subsequent Dreams (2022)
- Travelogue (2022)
- Hypnosis (2022)
- Muskingum Mysteries (2022)
- Astral Mornings (2022)
- Departures (2023)
- Intonation (2023)
- Objects (2023)

== Film ==
- The Pedal Movie (2021), as self

== See also ==
- Suzanne Ciani
- Éliane Radigue
- Laurie Spiegel
- Else Marie Pade
- Wendy Carlos
