= Bob Moog Foundation =

US non-profit organization

- Formation: 2006; 20 years ago
- Founder: Family of Robert Moog
- Founded at: Asheville, United States
- Type: Nonprofit
- Headquarters: 56 Broadway Street
- Location: Asheville, North Carolina, United States
- Region served: Worldwide
- Executive Director: Michelle Moog-Koussa
- Assistant Director: Craig Frustaci
- Board of directors: David Mash; Marcus Ryle; Sally Sparks; Terence Van Arkel; Chris Halaby; Henry Panion, III; Dave Rossum; Scott Callan; Kim-Ha Ho; Sandy Jordan; David Sayed; Lindsey Wahowiak
- Website: moogfoundation.org

The Bob Moog Memorial Foundation is a non-profit organization created after the death of Dr. Robert Moog in 2005, and officially launched in August 2006. His family established the foundation as "a reflection of Bob Moog's legacy: To educate and inspire people through the power and possibilities of electronic music, and through the intersection of music and science." The foundation is an independent, donor-driven 501(c)(3) organization with no formal affiliations with Moog Music. It is located in Asheville, North Carolina, where Moog spent the last 25 years of his life.

The Bob Moog Foundation's projects include Dr. Bob's SoundSchool, which teaches the science of sound through music, the Bob Moog Foundation Archives, an effort to preserve and protect Dr. Moog's extensive and historic archive and a museum named the "Moogseum," an innovative educational, historic, and cultural facility located in Asheville.

== History ==
Dr. Robert Moog was an electrical engineer and American pioneer of electronic musical instruments like the Theremin and the Moog Synthesizer. As the founder of Moog Music and the inventor of the first commercial synthesizer, Moog left an indelible mark on the music industry. Moog died in 2005 and a year later, Moog's family established the Bob Moog Memorial Foundation to honor his legacy.

Moog's daughter, Michelle Moog-Koussa, launched the foundation in 2006 and became the foundation's Executive Director. With no financial backing, she began the process of restoring and preserving hundreds of boxes of archival material related to Moog's life work. In August 2009, the foundation partnered with the Museum of Making Music to launch a special exhibition of the work, impact, and collaborations of Bob Moog, including items from Moog's archive, vintage instruments, and memorabilia, with the eight-month exhibit attracting nearly 22,000 visitors. The foundation also received grants from the GRAMMY Foundation toward further archive restoration work.

In 2010, the first permanent installation of Bob Moog's archives was installed at the Orange Peel following a ribbon cutting ceremony by the Beastie Boys. The installation was named the "MiniMoogseum" to illustrate that it was a miniature version of a future Moogseum in Asheville.

== Moogseum ==
Moogseum
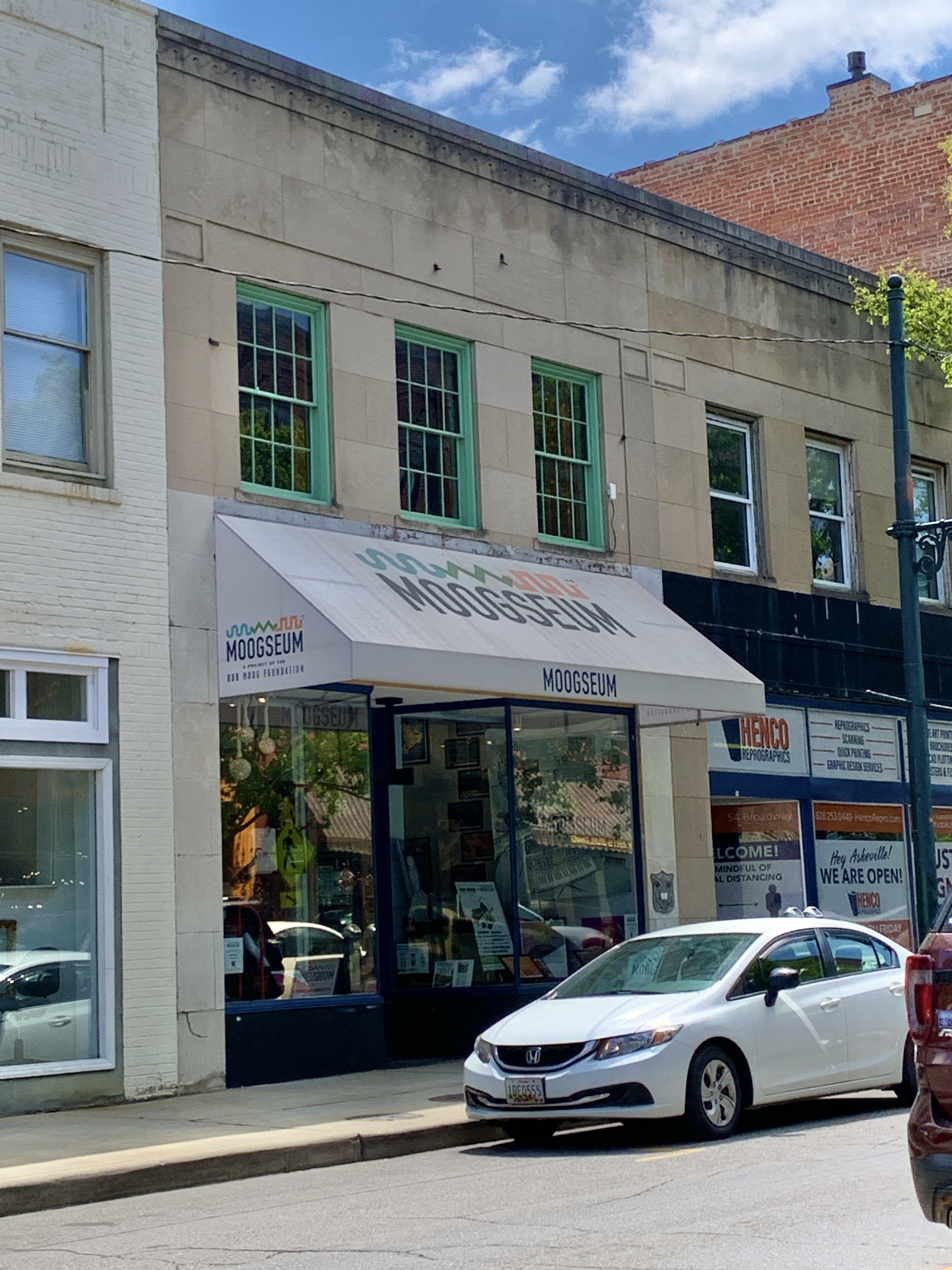
- Moogseum
- Established: 23 May 2019
- Location: 56 Broadway St Front, Asheville, US
- Type: Science museum Music museum
- Executive director: Michelle Moog-Koussa
- Website: moogseum.org

In May 2019, coinciding with what would have been Bob Moog's 85th birthday, the Bob Moog Foundation opened the Moogseum at 56 Broadway Street in Asheville. A grand opening followed on August 15th, with a multi-day ceremony, including presentations by Herb Deutsch and Larry Fast, and interviews and performances by Patrick Moraz and Lisa Bella Donna.

A signature project of the foundation, the museum's mission is to bring "synthesizer pioneer Bob Moog's legacy to life by allowing visitors to explore his contribution to the world of sound and music with multi-sensory, interactive timelines and exhibits, an immersive dome presenting how electricity becomes sound, historical exploration of synthesizers, and the opportunity for guests to play both theremins and Moog synthesizers."

In 2021, the Moogseum announced that it was participating in Google Arts and Culture’s Music, Makers, and Machines exhibition together with 55 partner museums from around the world. That May, a team from the PBS travel show Samantha Brown's Places to Love visited the Moogseum, which was included in an Ashville-centered episode that aired in 2022.
