= Moog synthesizer =

Electronic musical instrument

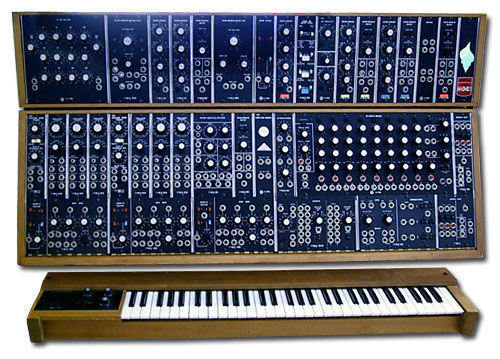
- A 1975 Moog Modular 55 system
- Manufacturer: R. A. Moog Co.
- Dates: 1965–1981, 2014–present

Technical specifications
- Oscillator: VCO
- Synthesis type: Subtractive
- Filter: VCF

Input/output

The Moog synthesizer (/moʊɡ/ MOHG) is a modular synthesizer invented by the American engineer Robert Moog in 1964. Moog's company, R. A. Moog Co., produced numerous models from 1965 to 1981, and again from 2014. It was the first commercial synthesizer and established the analog synthesizer concept.

The Moog synthesizer consists of separate modules which create and shape sounds, which are connected via patch cords. Modules include voltage-controlled oscillators, amplifiers, filters, envelope generators, noise generators, triggers and mixers. The synthesizer can be played using controllers including keyboards, joysticks, pedals and ribbon controllers, or controlled with sequencers. Its oscillators produce waveforms, which can be modulated and filtered to shape their sounds (subtractive synthesis) or used to control other modules (low-frequency oscillation).

Moog developed the synthesizer in response to demand for more practical and affordable electronic music equipment, guided by suggestions and requests from composers including Herb Deutsch, Richard Teitelbaum, Vladimir Ussachevsky and Wendy Carlos. Moog's principal innovation was voltage control, which uses voltage to control pitch. He also introduced fundamental synthesizer concepts such as modularity and envelope generators.

The Moog synthesizer was brought to the mainstream by Switched-On Bach (1968), a bestselling album of Bach compositions arranged for Moog synthesizer by Carlos. Mort Garson used the Moog to soundtrack the televised Apollo 11 moonwalk, associating synthesizers with space in the popular imagination. In the late 1960s, it was adopted by rock and pop acts including the Doors, the Grateful Dead, the Rolling Stones and the Beatles. At its height of popularity, it was a staple of 1970s progressive rock, used by acts including Yes, Tangerine Dream and Emerson, Lake & Palmer. With its ability to imitate instruments such as strings and horns, it threatened the jobs of session musicians and was banned from use in commercial work for a period of time in the United States. In 1970, Moog Music released a portable, self-contained model, the Minimoog.

== Development ==
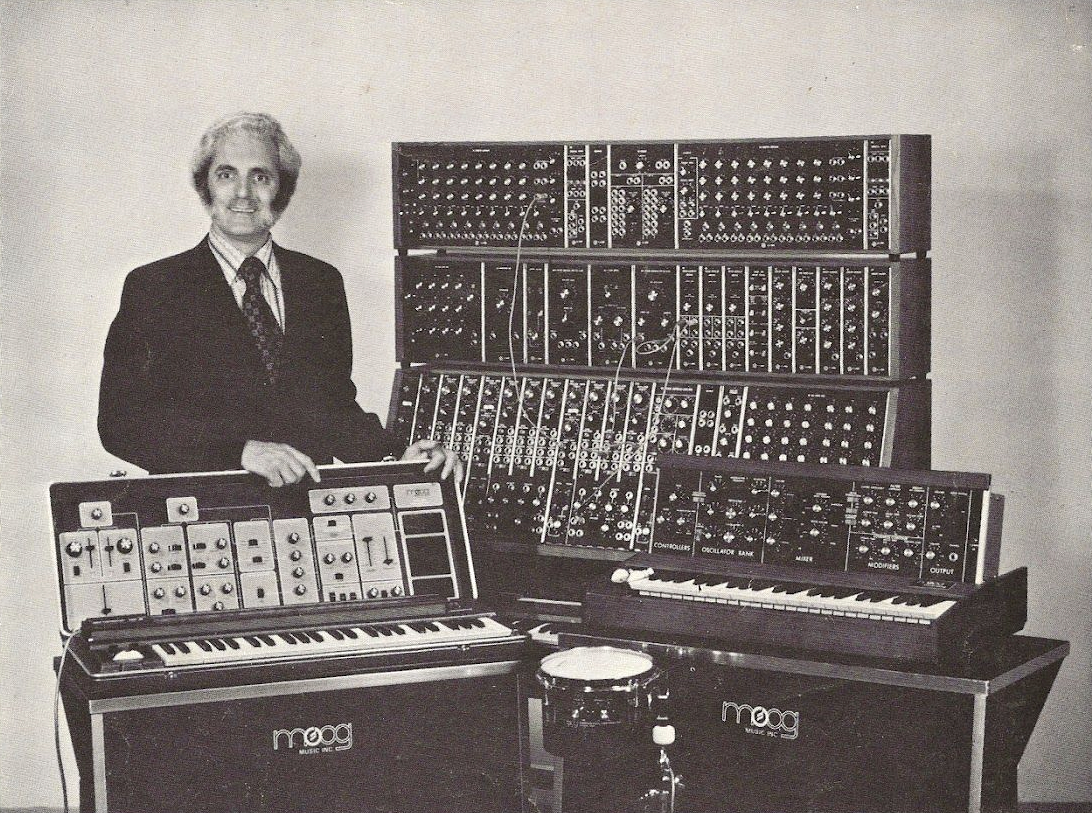
Robert Moog in the 1970s

In the early 1960s, electronic music technology was impractical and used mainly by experimental composers to create music with little mainstream appeal. In 1963, the American engineer Robert Moog, a doctoral student at Cornell University who designed and sold theremins, met the composer Herb Deutsch at a New York State School Music Association trade fair in Rochester, New York. Deutsch had been making electronic music using a theremin, tape recorder, and single-pitch oscillator, a time-consuming process that involved splicing tape. Recognizing the need for more practical and sophisticated equipment, Moog and Deutsch discussed the notion of a "portable electronic music studio".

Moog received a grant of $16,000 from the New York State Small Business Association and began work in Trumansburg, New York, not far from the Cornell campus. At the time, synthesizer-like instruments filled rooms. Moog hoped to build a more compact instrument that would appeal to musicians. Learning from his experience building a prohibitively expensive guitar amplifier, he believed that practicality and affordability were the most important parameters.

Previous synthesizers, such as the RCA Mark II, had created sound from hundreds of vacuum tubes. Instead, Moog used newly available silicon transistors – specifically, transistors with an exponential relationship between input voltage and output current. With these, he created the voltage-controlled oscillator (VCO), which generated a waveform whose pitch could be adjusted by changing the voltage. Moog designed his synthesizer around a standard of one volt per octave, and used voltage to control loudness with voltage-controlled amplifiers (VCAs).

Moog developed a prototype with two VCOs and a VCA. As the VCOs could output voltage, one could be used to modulate the output of another, creating effects such as vibrato and tremolo. According to Moog, when Deutsch saw this, he became excited and immediately began making music with the prototype, attracting the interest of passersby: "They would stand there, they'd listen and they'd shake their heads ... What is this weird shit coming out of the basement?"

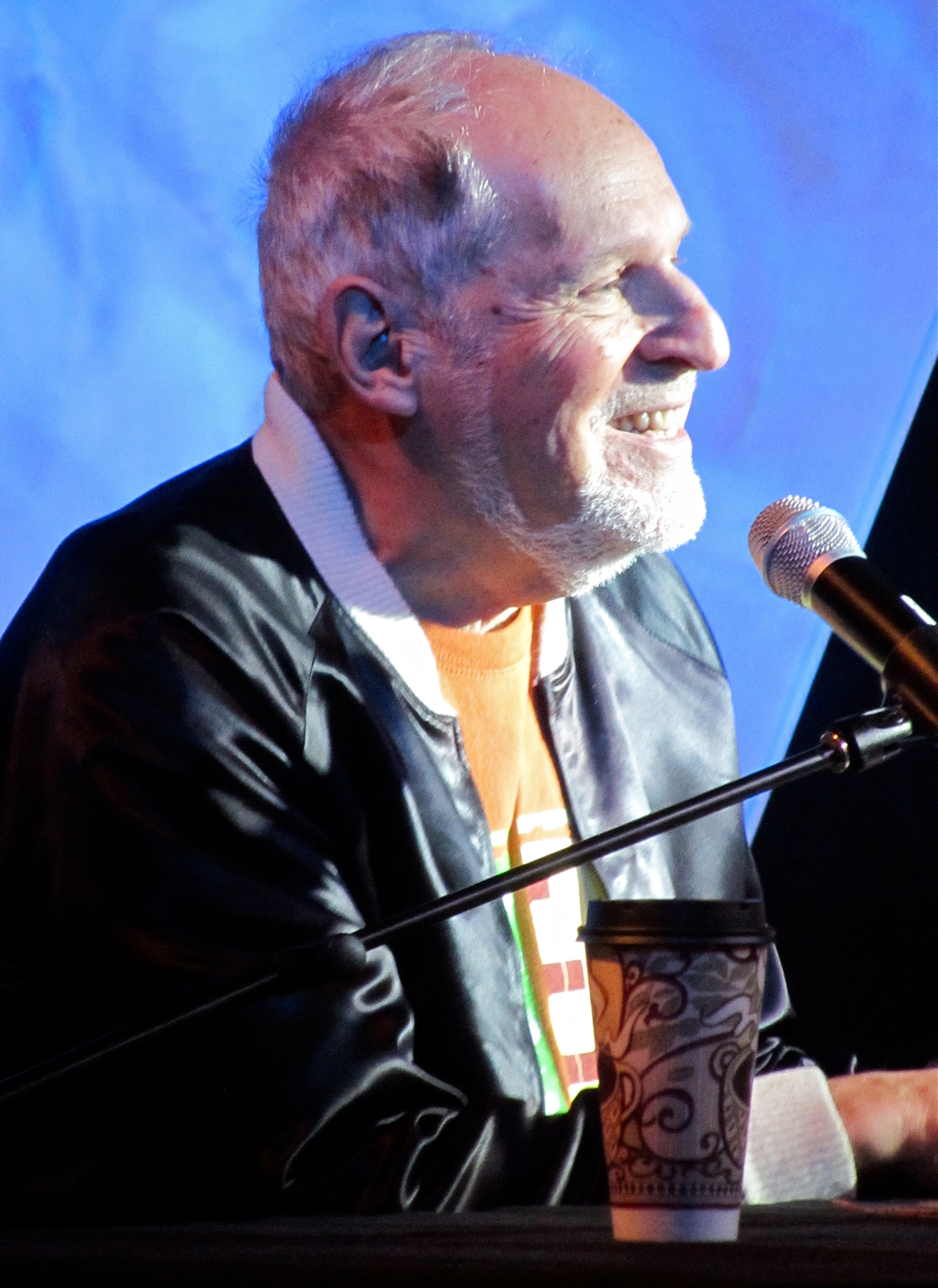
The composer Herb Deutsch (pictured in 2011) helped Moog refine his synthesizer.

In 1964, Moog and Deutsch demonstrated the synthesizer at the electronic music studio at the University of Toronto. After the presentation impressed the composers, Moog was invited by the Audio Engineering Society to present at their annual convention in New York City that October. Though he had not planned to sell synthesizers there, some customers placed orders at the show, and the choreographer Alwin Nikolais became the first person to purchase a commercially made Moog synthesizer.

Moog constructed synthesizers to order. The first order for a complete Moog synthesizer, for which Moog had to design a keyboard and cabinet, came from the composer Eric Siday. With no books and no way to save or share settings, early users had to learn how to use the synthesizer themselves, by word of mouth, or from seminars held by Moog and Deutsch.

Moog refined the synthesizer in response to requests from musicians and composers. For example, after Deutsch suggested Moog find a way to fade notes in and out, Moog invented an envelope module using a doorbell button as a prototype. At the suggestion of the composer Gustav Ciamaga, Moog developed a filter module, a means of removing frequencies from waveforms. His first filter design created a sound similar to a wah-wah pedal. He later developed the distinctive "ladder" filter, which was the only item in the synthesizer design that Moog patented, granted on October 28, 1969. Further developments were driven by suggestions from musicians including Richard Teitelbaum, Vladimir Ussachevsky and Wendy Carlos. Carlos suggested the first touch-sensitive keyboard, portamento control and filter bank, which became standard features.

There was debate as to the role of the keyboard in synthesizers. Some, such as the composer Vladimir Ussachevsky and Moog's competitor Don Buchla, felt they were restrictive. However, Moog recognized that most customers wanted keyboards and found they made the instrument more approachable. Including keyboards in photographs helped users understand that the synthesizer was for making music.

The classical meaning of "to synthesize" is to assemble a whole out of parts. Moog initially avoided the word, as it was associated with the RCA synthesizer, and instead described his invention as a "system" of "electronic music modules". After many debates, Moog eventually told the composer Reynold Weidenaar: "It's a synthesizer and that's what it does and we're just going to have to go with it." He used the word in print for the first time in 1966. By the 1970s, "synthesizer" had become the standard term for such instruments.

Most of the Moog modules were finalized by the end of the 1960s, and remained mostly unchanged until Moog Music ceased trading in the 1980s. Moog had pursued the development of his synthesizer as a hobby; he stressed that he was not a businessman, and had not known what a balance sheet was. He likened the experience to riding theme park amusements: "You know you're not going to get hurt too badly because nobody would let you do that, but you're not quite in control." In 1982, Moog donated his synthesizer prototype to the Henry Ford Museum's permanent collection. In 1989, the Stearns Collection of Musical Instruments at the University of Michigan acquired Nikolais' 1964 Moog synthesizer for their permanent collection. The museum director said it was "to the music world what the Wright Brothers' airplane is to aviation".

== Components ==
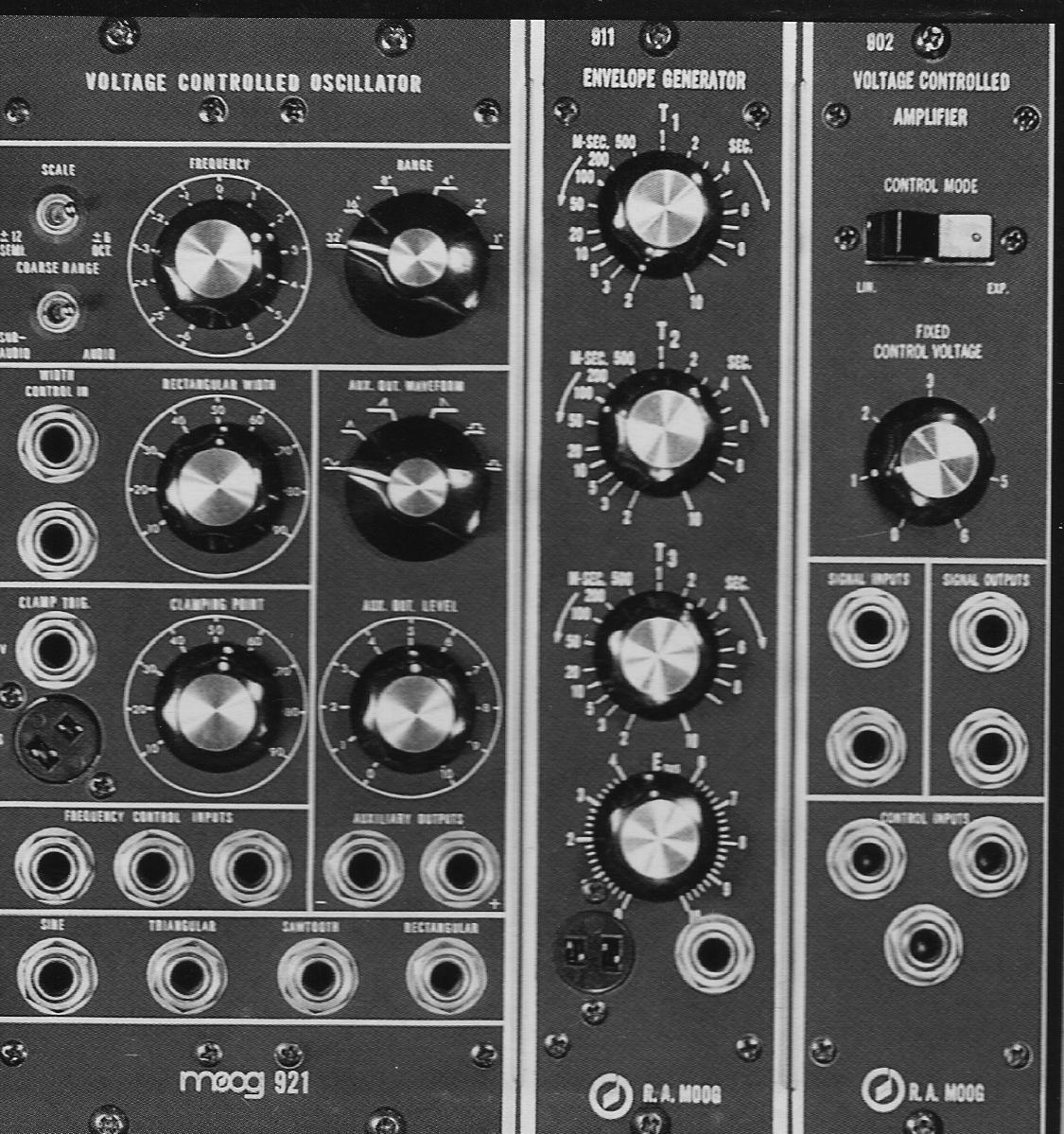
Modules: 921 VCO, 911 Envelope Generator; 902 VCA

The Moog synthesizer consists of separate modules – such as oscillators, amplifiers, envelope generators, filters, noise generators, triggers and mixers – which can be connected in a variety of ways via patch cords. The modules can also be used to control each other. They do not produce sound until a workable combination of modules are connected.

The oscillators produce waveforms of different tones and overtones, such as a "bright, full, brassy" sawtooth wave, a thinner, flute-like triangle wave, a "nasal, reedy" pulse wave and a "whistle-like" sine wave. These waveforms can be modulated and filtered to produce more combinations of sounds (subtractive synthesis). The oscillators are difficult to keep in tune, and small temperature changes cause them to drift rapidly. As Moog's early customers were more interested in creating experimental music than playing conventional melodies, Moog did not consider keeping the oscillators stable a priority.

The Moog's 24db low-pass filter is particularly distinctive, with a "rich", "juicy", "fat" sound. The filter, based on pairs of transistors connected by capacitors arranged in a ladder-like layout, attenuates frequencies above a level set by the user, and boosts the frequencies around the cut-off frequency. When overdriven, the filter produces a distinctive distortion described as the "Moog sound".

The synthesizer can be played using controllers including keyboards, joysticks, pedals and ribbon controllers. The ribbon controller allows users to control pitch similarly to moving a finger along a violin string.

== Impact ==
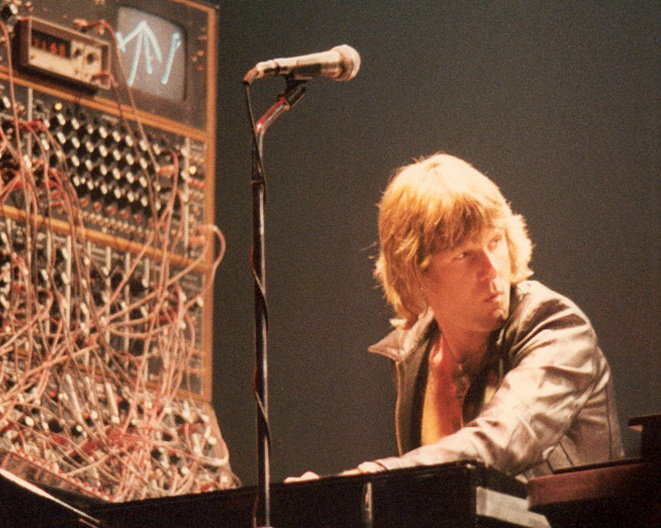
Keith Emerson performing with a Moog synthesizer in 1970

New Scientist described the Moog as the first commercial synthesizer. It was much smaller than previous synthesizers, and much cheaper, at US$10,000 compared to the six-figure sums of other synthesizers. Whereas the RCA Mark II was programmed with punch cards, Moog's synthesizer could be played in real time via keyboard, making it attractive to musicians.

According to the Guardian, Moog's 1964 paper Voltage-Controlled Music Modules, in which he proposed the Moog synthesizer modules, invented the modern concept of the analog synthesizer. The authors of Analog Days wrote: "Though the notion of voltage control and Moog's circuit designs were not original, Moog's innovations were in drawing the elements together, realizing that the problem of exponential conversion could be solved using transistor circuitry and building such circuits and making them work in a way that was of interest to musicians."

Moog features such as voltage-controlled oscillator, envelopes, noise generators, filters and sequencers became standards in the synthesizer market. The ladder filter has been replicated in hardware synthesizers, digital signal processors, field-programmable gate arrays and software synthesizers.

=== Early adopters and Switched-On Bach ===
Most Moog synthesizers were owned by universities or record labels, and used to create soundtracks or jingles. By 1970, only 28 were owned by musicians. The Moog was first used by experimental composers including Richard Teitelbaum, Dick Hyman, and Perrey and Kingsley.

The composer Mort Garson recorded the first album on the West Coast to use the Moog synthesizer, The Zodiac: Cosmic Sounds (1967). Moog attended a recording session for the album, which helped convince him of the synthesizer's commercial potential. Garson also used the Moog to write jingles and soundtracks, which helped make its sounds ubiquitous. In 1969, Garson used the Moog to compose a soundtrack for the televised footage of the Apollo 11 moonwalk, creating a link between electronic music and space in the American popular imagination.

In 1968, Wendy Carlos released Switched-On Bach, an album of Bach compositions arranged for Moog synthesizer. It won three Grammy Awards and was the first classical album certified platinum. The album is credited for popularising the Moog and demonstrating that synthesizers could be more than "random noise machines". For a period, the name Moog became so associated with electronic music that it was sometimes used as a generic term for any synthesizer. Moog liked this, but disapproved of the numerous "cruddy" novelty records released with his name attached, such as Music to Moog By, Moog España and Moog Power.

=== Rock and pop ===
An early use of the Moog synthesizer in rock music came with the 1967 song by the Doors "Strange Days". In the same year, the Monkees used a Moog on their album Pisces, Aquarius, Capricorn & Jones Ltd. In 1969, George Harrison released an album of Moog recordings, Electronic Sound, and the Beatles used the Moog on several tracks on their album Abbey Road. Other rock bands who adopted the Moog include the Grateful Dead and the Rolling Stones. It was also adopted by jazz musicians including Herbie Hancock, Jan Hammer and Sun Ra.

In the 1970s, at the height of its popularity, the Moog was used by progressive rock bands such as Yes, Tangerine Dream, and Emerson, Lake & Palmer. Keith Emerson was the first major rock musician to perform live with the Moog, and it became a trademark of his performances. According to Analog Days, the likes of Emerson "did for the keyboard what Jimi Hendrix did for the guitar".

Almost every element of Donna Summer's 1977 influential song "I Feel Love" was created with a Moog synthesizer, with the producers aiming to create a futuristic mood. Robert Moog was critical, saying the sequenced bassline had a "certain sterility" and that Summer sounded like she was "fighting the sequencer". In later decades, hip hop groups such as the Beastie Boys and rock bands including They Might Be Giants and Wilco "revived an interest in the early Moog synthesizer timbres".

=== Industry ===
The Guardian wrote that the Moog synthesizer, with its dramatically new sounds, arrived at a time in American history when, in the wake of the Vietnam War, "nearly everything about the old order was up for revision". Session musicians felt synthesizers, with their ability to imitate instruments such as strings and horns, threatened their jobs. For a period, the Moog was banned from use in commercial work in the US, a restriction negotiated by the American Federation of Musicians (AFM). Robert Moog felt that the AFM had not realized that the synthesizer was an instrument to be learnt and mastered like any other, and instead imagined that "all the sounds that musicians could make somehow existed in the Moog – all you had to do was push a button that said 'Jascha Heifetz' and out would come the most fantastic violin player".

== Successors ==
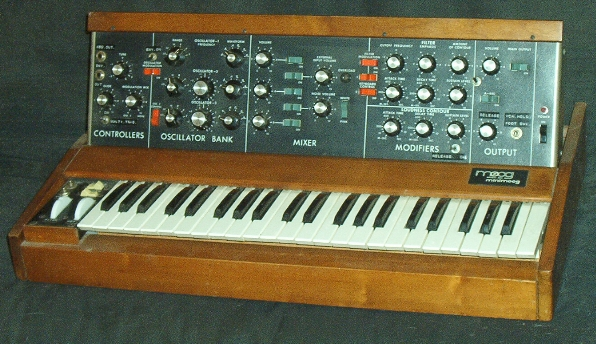
The Minimoog, a portable, self-contained Moog synthesizer

In 1970, Moog Music released the Minimoog, a portable, self-contained model, and the modular systems became a secondary part of Moog's business. The Minimoog has been described as the most famous and influential synthesizer in history.

After the sale of Moog Music, production of Moog synthesizers stopped in the early 1980s. The patents and other rights to Moog's modular circuits expired in the 1990s. In 2002, after Robert Moog regained the rights to the Moog brand and bought the company, Moog released the Minimoog Voyager, an updated version. Moog released several Minimoog reissues, with some changes, starting from 2016. In 2018, Moog released the Grandmother, followed by the Matriarch in 2019; parts of the circuitry used in these instruments were inspired by the Moog synthesizer.

=== Clones and emulations ===
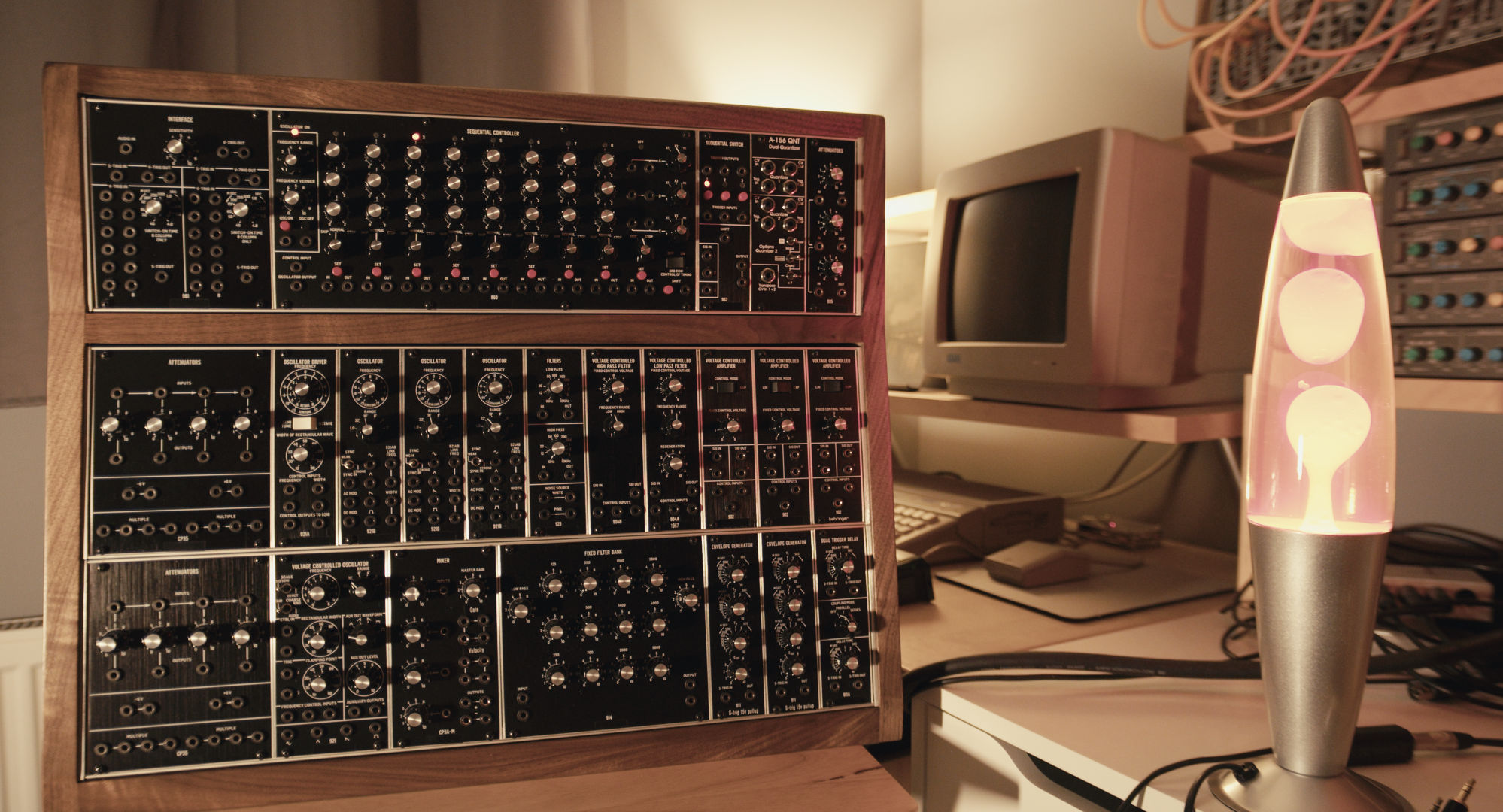
A Behringer clone of a Moog modular synthesizer

After production of the original Moog synthesizers stopped in 1980, some manufacturers, such as Synthesizers.com, created their own modules and clones of Moog modules. Moog modules, known as the "dotcom" or "5U" format, are still available but have been superseded as the dominant synthesizer format by Eurorack. Since 2020, Behringer has manufactured clones of Moog modules in the Eurorack format, also sold in configurations based on the original Moog systems.

The Moog synthesizer has been emulated in software synthesizers such as the Arturia Modular V. In 2016, Moog released the Moog Model 15 app, a software emulation of the Model 15 initially for iOS and later in 2021 for macOS.

== See also ==
- List of Moog synthesizer players
