= 77 Million Paintings =

Video by Brian Eno
- Released: 2006
- Genre: Ambient
- Label: All Saints

77 Million Paintings is a digital art software/DVD combination by British musician Brian Eno, released in 2006.

The release consists of two discs, one containing the software that creates the randomized music and images that emulate a single screen of one of Eno's video installation pieces. The other is a DVD containing interviews with the artist.

The title is derived from the possible number of combinations of video and music which can be generated by the software, effectively ensuring that the same image/soundscape is never played twice.

An accompanying booklet includes a piece by Nick Robertson describing the intention behind the software, and an article by Brian Eno ("My Light Years") describing his experiments with light and music.

The software was developed by Jake Dowie for both Windows and Macintosh operating systems.

== First Edition ==
Far from containing 77 million paintings, the software consists of 296 original works which are overlaid and combined up to four at a time in a simulation of simultaneous projection onto a common screen. The various images are slowly faded in and out asynchronously before being replaced by another random element. Also, the music that accompanies the paintings, if played on a Mac G5 or a Windows PC, is randomly generated in a similar way, so the selection of elements and their duration in the piece are arbitrarily chosen, forming a virtually infinite number of variations.

In conjunction with this, Annabeth Robinson (AngryBeth Shortbread) recreated the performance in Second Life by building the performance in a multi-user virtual environment (MUVE).

== Second Edition ==
A second edition of "77 Million Paintings", featuring improved morphing and a further two layers of sound, was released on 14 January 2008.

== Installation CD ==
Released in a numbered edition of 1000, only on the Japanese label Beat Records in 2006 via license from Opal, 77 Million contains 9 audio tracks generated at the March 2006 Laforet, Tokyo installation of 77 Million Paintings.

== Project evolution ==
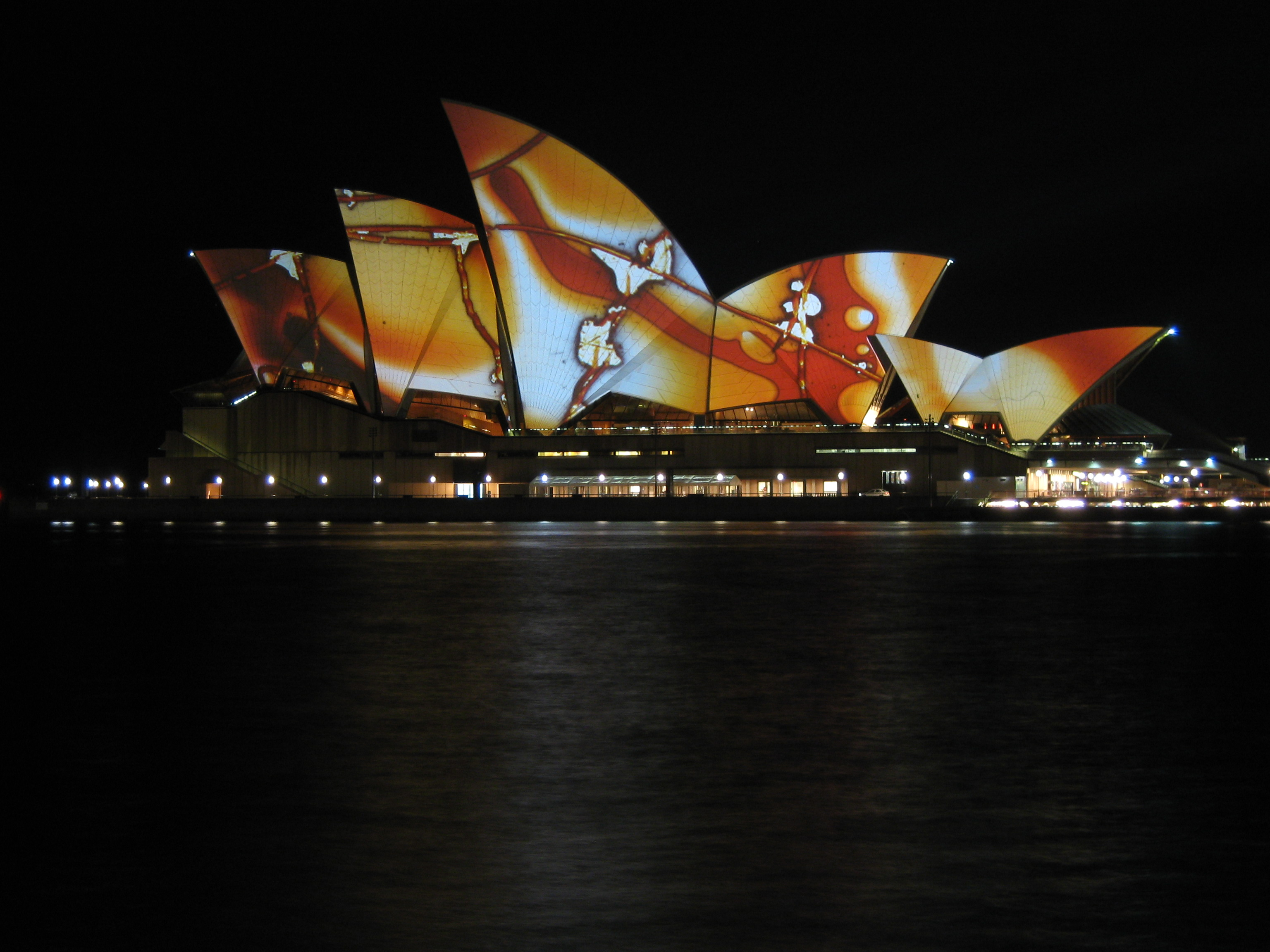
77 Million Paintings projected onto the Sydney Opera House in 2009

77 Million Paintings has evolved beyond the domestic environment. It continues to be shown in multiple-monitor configurations in art galleries and is projected onto iconic buildings around the world. In 2009, Eno was invited to project 77 Million Paintings onto the sails of the Sydney Opera House.

== See also ==
- Generative art
- Procedural generation
