= Thingamakit =

Analog sound synthesizer kit

The Thingamakit, also stylized ThingamKIT, was an anthropomorphic analog sound synthesizer kit sold by Bleep Labs between 2008 and 2010. It was the first kit produced by the company.

It was offered with an optional stompbox-style enclosure (commonly used for guitar effects, but just about any small enclosure can be used to contain the electronics. The Thingamakit is based on voltage controlled oscillators that are commonly used in the production of electronic music. However, this synth is unique in its application of LED outputs and photocell inputs. The LEDs are adjusted to blink at various rates, and they are positioned above the photocells to affect the sound.

Two LEDs are positioned at the end of flexible extensions known as "LEDacles". The layout of switches, knobs and photocells, combined with the tentacle-like LEDacles, give the appearance of a face. Many users decorate their Thingamakits to look like robots, animals, etc.

The Thingamakit is designed in such a way that it can easily be modified and/or circuit bent to produce a wide variety of experimental sounds. Clear instructions, simple design and low cost make it a good choice for electronic musicians who want to experiment with DIY instruments.
