= New York State School Music Association =

The New York State School Music Association (NYSSMA) is the New York affiliate of the National Association for Music Education. NYSSMA is a professional organization that evaluates student musicians in New York state from elementary school to high school. Each spring, students register through their school music programs to attend NYSSMA Evaluation Festivals where they are adjudicated.

These festivals take place at local middle and high schools, state colleges and universities within the fifteen NYSSMA areas.

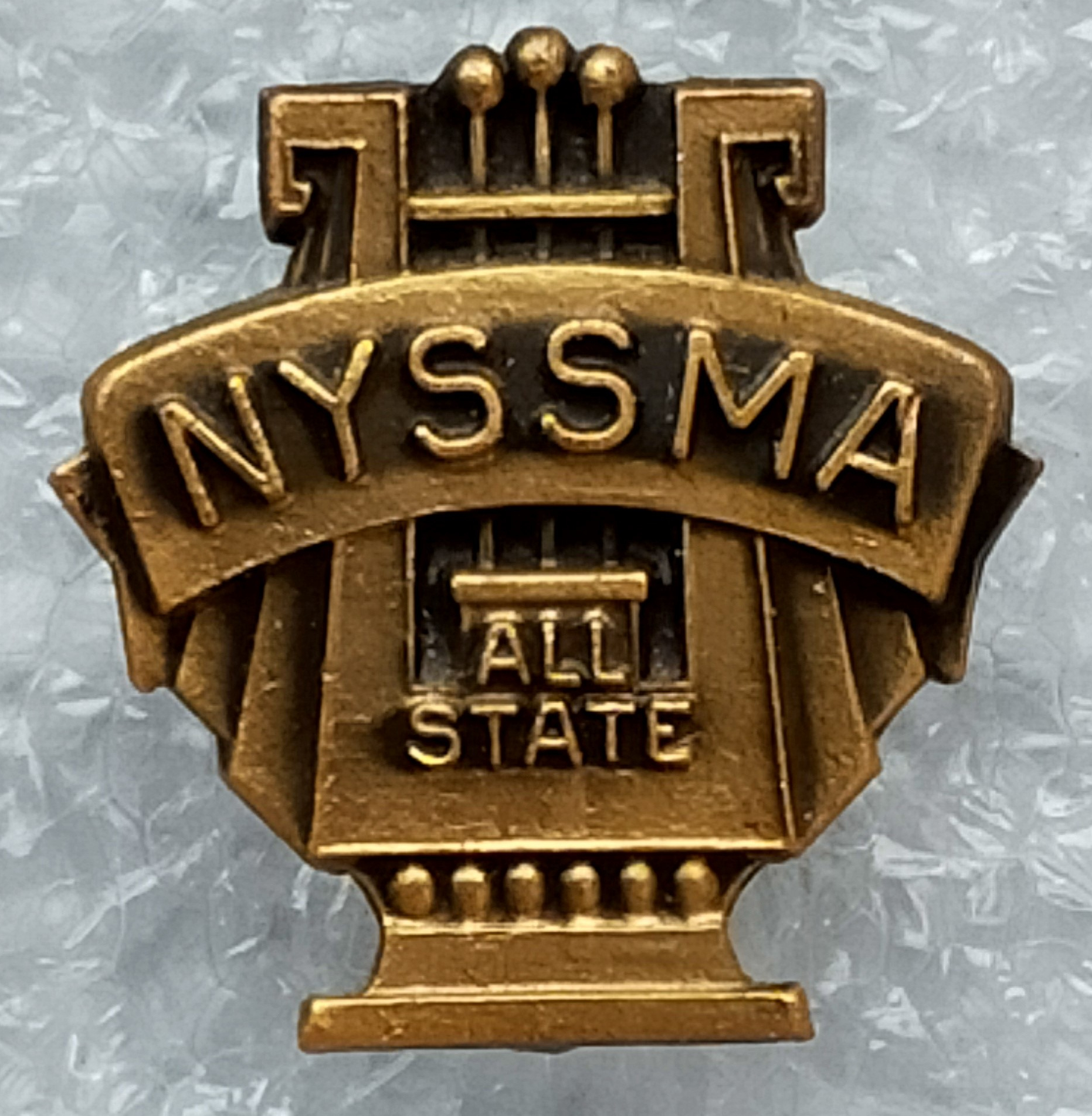
NYSSMA lapel pin produced in 1930-1940s by Dieges & Clust

At each festival, students perform scales, a solo or ensemble piece of their choice from the designated NYSSMA repertoire, and a sight reading piece. The judges score and comment on the students' performances according to defined guidelines set by NYSSMA.

Instruments evaluated include voice, piano, strings, woodwinds/brasses, and percussion. NYSSMA scores and comments are often used by music teachers as diagnostics.

Students who play saxophones, brasses or percussion or sing can choose to be evaluated in NYSSMA Jazz Festival where they have an opportunity to be selected into various jazz ensembles.

Performance groups include All-County, Area All-State (part of New York State), and All-State.

There are a total of six levels, each with a progressively more challenging repertoire. The judging categories are allotted a set number of points out of the total. NYSSMA provides sight reading passages for all six levels from a proprietary manual.
