= Herbert Deutsch =

American composer (1932–2022)

Herbert Arnold Deutsch
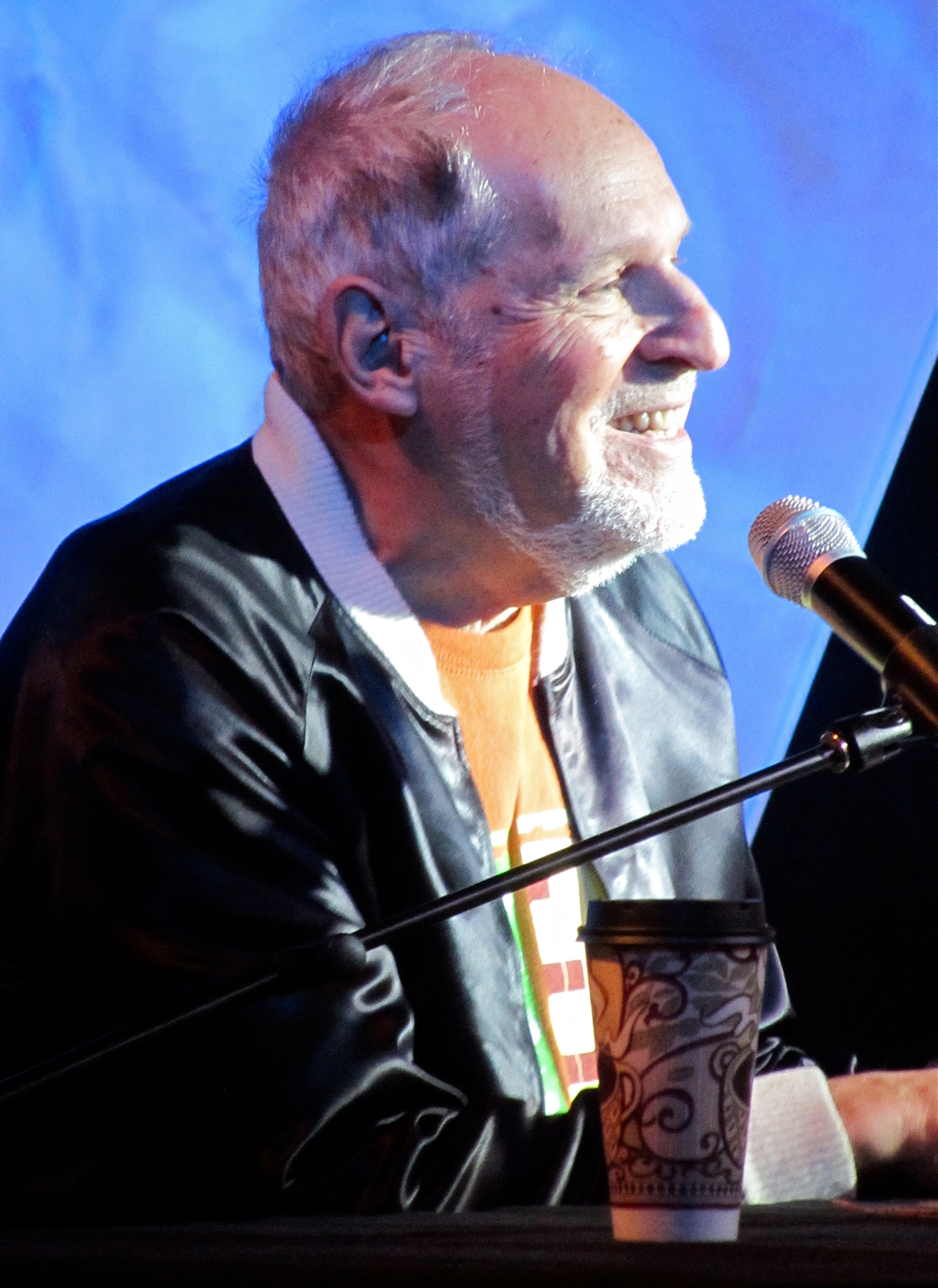
- Deutsch speaks at MoogFest 2011
- Born: February 9, 1932; Baldwin, Nassau County, New York, U.S.
- Died: December 9, 2022 (aged 90)
- Occupations: Composer, educator, electronic music pioneer

Herbert Arnold "Herb" Deutsch (February 9, 1932 – December 9, 2022) was an American composer, inventor, and educator. Until his death in 2022, he was professor emeritus of electronic music and composition at Hofstra University. He was best known for co-inventing the Moog synthesizer with Bob Moog in 1964.

== Early life and education ==
Deutsch was born in 1932 in Hempstead, New York. At the age of four, he first realized he had a musical gift. Throughout his childhood, he studied music and began composing at a young age. Deutsch attended the Manhattan School of Music, earning his B.A. and M.A. there.

== Work with Moog ==
Deutsch had assembled a theremin based on Moog's design in 1962 and in November 1963 he introduced himself to Moog at a music-education conference in Rochester, New York. In 1964 Moog and Deutsch started investigating the possibilities of a new instrument to aid composers. Deutsch has been credited with the keyboard interface of the Moog. He composed the first piece ever for the Moog ("Jazz Images – A Worksong and Blues") and performed early Moog concerts at The Town Hall and The Museum of Modern Art in New York (1969's 'Jazz in the Garden'). The prototype Moog synthesizer, developed by Bob Moog and Herbert Deutsch in 1964, is part of the collections of The Henry Ford museum.

== Career ==
Deutsch was a dedicated educator. In the early 1970s he taught at St. Agnes High School in Rockville Centre, New York. He taught at Hofstra University for over 50 years and was twice the chair of the music department. Deutsch co-founded the Long Island Composers Alliance in 1972, and worked with music foundation NYSSMA. In 1994 he proposed its Electronic Music Composition Showcase.

== Death ==
Deutsch died on December 9, 2022, at the age of 90 at his home in Massapequa Park, New York.
