= Type casting (typography) =

Technique for casting individual letters for use in printing presses

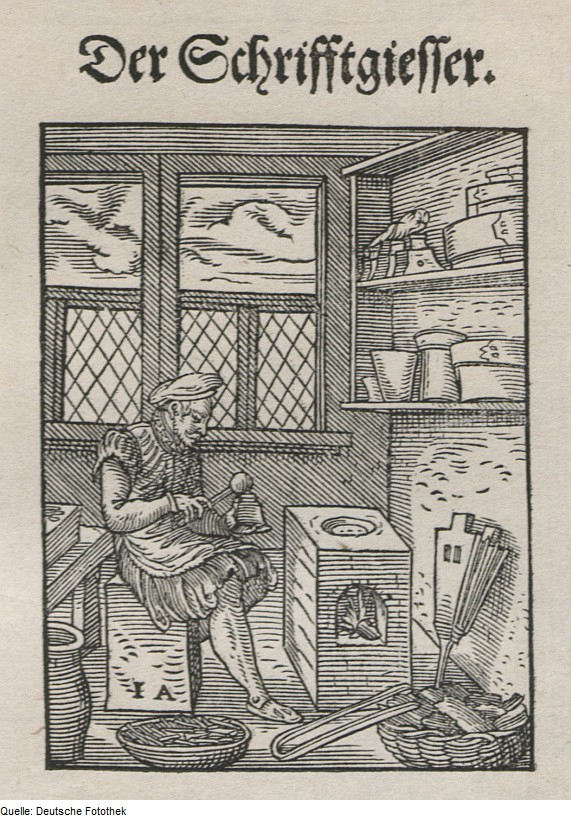
1568 illustration of a German type founder pouring molten type metal into a hand mold.

Type casting is a technique for casting the individual letters known as sorts used in hot metal typesetting by pouring molten metal into brass moulds called matrices.

== Gutenberg ==
Woodblock printing had been known in China for centuries. It was innovations in type casting that made for Gutenberg's breakthrough of commercially printing. Although using matrices was a technique known well before his time, Johannes Gutenberg adapted their use to a conveniently adjustable hand mould, enabling one to easily and accurately cast identical multiple instances of any character.

The ultimate product of manual typecasting were letters, known as sorts for letterpress printing, and the process starts with the installation of a matrix with the impression of a particular glyph into the bottom of the hand mould which is adjusted for the width of the body and locked in preparation for casting. Molten type metal alloy would be carefully poured into a straight-sided vertical cavity at the top of the mould. The type caster would then give the mould a quick shake to aid the flow of type metal into every cavity of the matrix. In practice it was discovered that different glyphs would require different shakes to cast the characters properly. As the casting cooled down and solidified, the mould would be unlocked and the sort removed, ready for later finishing operations and locked again ready for the next character.

Manual casting was a long drawn-out process, but was able to produce precise and consistent excellent results.

== Automation ==
In 1805 Henri Didot of Paris, France patented a type casting machine.

David Bruce invented the first automated type casting machine in 1838, but it was the Monotype and Linotype machines that first effectively speeded up the process.

In 1887, Tolbert Lanston invented the Monotype mechanical typesetting machine. This was a type casting system that produced individual characters, in which a matrix case is used for holding all the font's matrices. In a manner somewhat reminiscent of hand type casting, every time a character is to be cast, the selection mechanism would position the matrix case so that the correct matrix is over the mould, hot metal would be injected, the sort removed and the process repeated until the job is finished.

Although the Linotype (1886) and Intertype (1914) approach to mechanical typesetting produced cast slugs that usually represent the complete line instead of individual characters, it still made use of individual bronze matrices stored in a magazine at the top of the machine, dispensed one per keystroke, assembled, sent to the caster where the slug was cast and the matrices re-distributed using a clever V-shaped keying mechanism.

The Ludlow display typecasting system is similar, in that it is also a linecasting process, although all the typesetting operations (matrix assembly and later distribution) are executed manually by a compositor.

Subsequent typesetting technologies made use of glyphs represented as photographic negatives or digital descriptions.

== See also ==
- Movable type
- Type foundry
