= Type metal =

Metal alloys used in traditional typefounding and hot metal typesetting

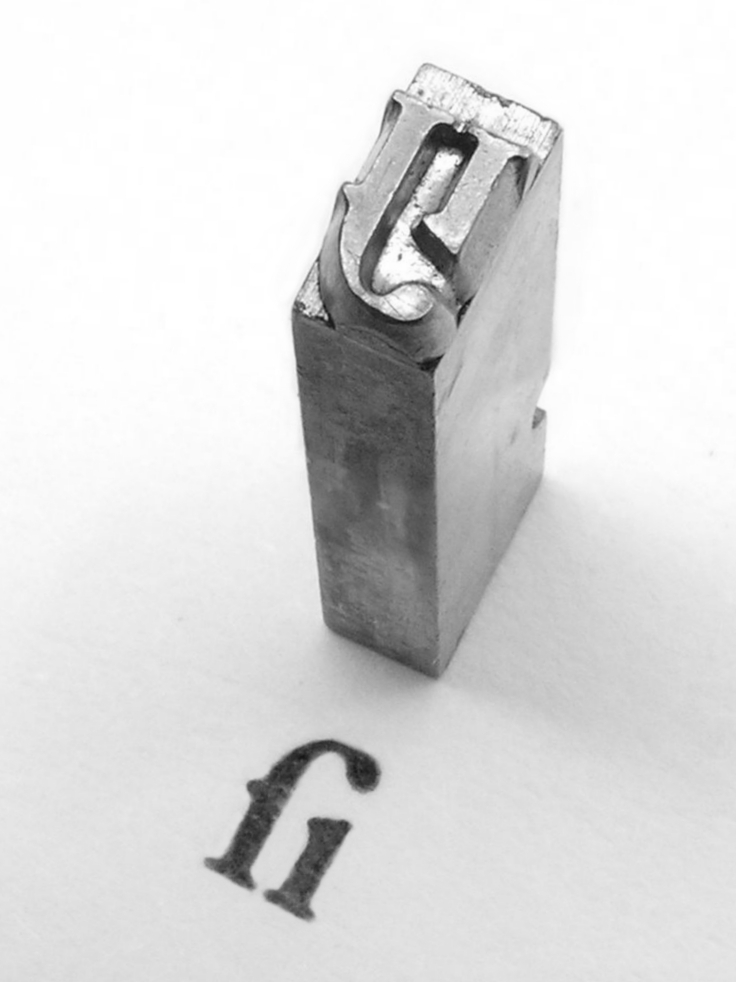
A sort made from type metal

In printing, type metal refers to the metal alloys used in traditional typefounding and hot metal typesetting. Historically, type metal was an alloy of lead, tin and antimony in different proportions depending on the application, be it individual character mechanical casting for hand setting, mechanical line casting or individual character mechanical typesetting and stereo plate casting. The proportions used are in the range: lead 50‒86%, antimony 11‒30% and tin 3‒20%. Antimony and tin are added to lead for durability while reducing the difference between the coefficients of expansion of the matrix and the alloy. Apart from durability, the general requirements for type-metal are that it should produce a true and sharp cast, and retain correct dimensions and form after cooling down. It should also be easy to cast, at reasonable low melting temperature, iron should not dissolve in the molten metal, and mould and nozzles should stay clean and easy to maintain. Today, Monotype machines can utilize a wide range of different alloys. Mechanical linecasting equipment uses alloys that are close to eutectic.

== History ==
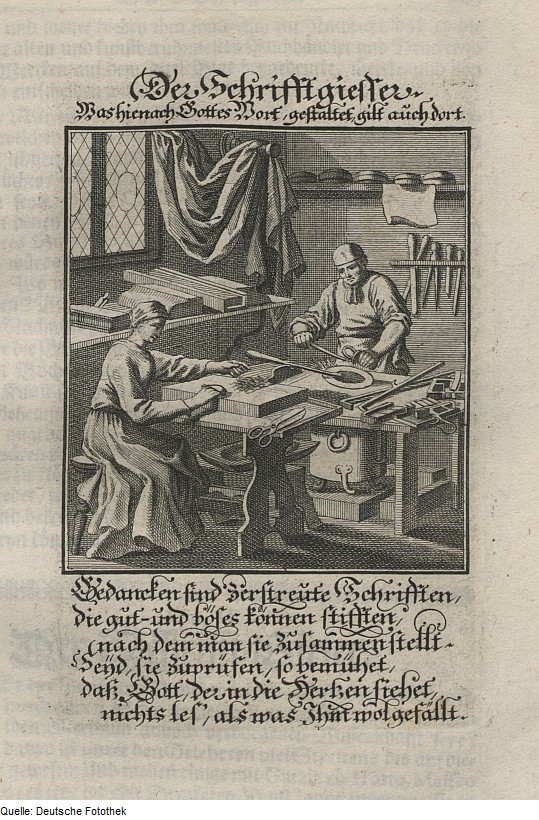
1698 illustration of a German typefounder preparing type-metal

Although the knowledge of casting soft metals in moulds was well established before Johannes Gutenberg's time, his discovery of an alloy that was hard, durable, and would take a clear impression from the mould represents a fundamental aspect of his solution to the problem of printing with movable type. This alloy did not shrink as much as lead alone when cooled. Gutenberg's other contributions were the creation of inks that would adhere to metal type and a method of softening handmade printing paper so that it would take the impression well.

== Required characteristics ==
Lead, processed from galena, was cheap plentiful and easily workable. Lead has many of the ideal characteristics required for a type metal, but on its own it lacks the necessary hardness and does not make castings with sharp details because molten lead shrinks and sags when it cools to a solid.

After much experimentation it was found that adding pewterer's tin, obtained from cassiterite, improved the ability of the cast type to withstand the wear and tear of the printing process, making it tougher but not more brittle.

Despite patiently trying different proportions of both metals, solving the second part of the type metal problem proved very difficult without the addition of yet a third metal, antimony.

Alchemists had shown that when stibnite, an antimony sulfide ore, was heated with scrap iron, metallic antimony was produced. The typefounder would typically introduce powdered stibnite and horseshoe nails into his crucible to melt lead, tin and antimony into type metal. Both the iron and the sulfides would be rejected in the process.

The addition of antimony conferred the much needed improvements in the properties of hardness, wear resistance and especially, the sharpness of reproduction of the type design, given that it has the curious property of diminishing the shrinkage of the alloy upon solidification.

== Composition of type metal ==
Type metal is an alloy of lead, tin and antimony in different proportions depending on the application, be it individual character mechanical casting for hand setting, mechanical line casting or individual character mechanical typesetting and stereo plate casting.

The proportions used are in the range: lead 50‒86%, antimony 11‒30% and tin 3‒20%. The basic characteristics of these metals are as follows:

=== Lead ===
Lead (Pb) is exceptionally soft, malleable, and ductile but with little tensile strength. Pure lead is a relatively cheap metal, is soft thus easy to work, and it is easy to cast since it melts at 327 °C (621 °F). However, it shrinks when it solidifies making letters that are not sharp enough for printing. In addition pure lead letters will quickly deform during use; a direct result of the easy workability of lead.

Lead oxide is a poison, that primarily damages brain function. Metallic lead is more stable and less toxic than its oxidized form, but the surface of pure lead oxidises quickly and easily. Metallic lead cannot be absorbed through contact with skin, so may be handled, carefully, with far less risk than lead oxide.

=== Tin ===
Tin (Sn) promotes the fluidity of the molten alloy and makes the type tough, giving the alloy resistance to wear. It is harder, stiffer and tougher than lead.

=== Antimony ===
Antimony (Sb) is a metalloid element, which melts at 630 °C (1,166 °F). Antimony forms a useful alloy with lead, increasing its hardness and mechanical strength. When casting, it increases fluidity of the melt and reduces shrinkage during cooling. When alloyed with lead to produce type metal, antimony gives it the hardness it needs to resist deformation during printing, and gives it sharper castings from the mould to produce clear, easily read printed text on the page.

=== Typical type metal proportions ===
The actual compositions differed over time, different machines were adjusted to different alloys depending on the intended uses of the type. Printers had sometimes their own preferences about the quality of particular alloys. The Lanston Monotype Corporation in the United Kingdom had a whole range of alloys listed in their manuals.

Type metal compositions
Alloy type	Tin (%)	Antimony (%)	Lead (%)	Comments
Slugcasting alloy	3	11	86	Ludlow/Intertype/Linotype composition for limited use and for making stereos
Eutectic alloy	4	12	84	Often used on slug casters and for Monotype/Elrod spacing material
Stereotype alloy	7	15	78	More durable intended for long print runs and curved printing plates
Monotype alloy	10	16	74	Most durable machine set intended to be remelted, sometimes hand set
Foundry type alloy	18	28	54	Traditional loose hand set type, may contain some copper

== Alloys for mechanical composition ==
Most mechanical typesetting is divided basically into two different competing technologies: line casting (Linotype and Intertype) and single character casting (Monotype).

The manuals for the Monotype composition caster (1952 and later editions) mention at least five different alloys to be used for casting, depending the purpose of the type and the work to be done with it.

Although in general Monotype cast type characters can be visually identified as having a square nick (as opposed to the round nicks used on foundry type), there is no easy way to identify the alloy aside from an expensive chemical assay in a laboratory.

Apart from this the two Monotype companies in the United States and the UK also made moulds with 'round' nicks. Typefounders and printers could and did order specially designed moulds to their own specifications: height, size, kind of nick, even the number of nicks could be changed.

Type produced with these special moulds can only be identified if the foundry or printer is known.

Type metal alloys mentioned in the UK-Monotype-caster manuals
	Sn/Sb (%)	Liquid at (°C)	Solid at (°C)	Hardness (Brinell)	Purpose
1	6/15	261	240	23.0	Routine
2	10/16	273	240	27.0	Dual (machine & hand composition)
3	9/19	286	240	28.5	Routine machine composition
4	13/17	283	240	29.5	Catalogues
5	12/24	330	240	33	Display type, heavy duty jobs

In Switzerland the company "Metallum Pratteln AG", in Basel had yet another list of type-metal alloys. If needed, any alloy according to customer specifications could be produced.

Usage	Sn/Sb (%)	Liquid at (°C)	Casting at (°C)	Remelting at (°C)	Hardness
Typograph	3/12	250	280...290	310...330	19
Ludlow	5/12	245	270...285	300...320	21
Lino/Intertype a	5/12	245	270...285	300...320	21
Lino/Intertype b	6/12	243	270...285	300...320	21.5
Lino/Intertype c	7/12	241	270...285	300...320	22
Stereotyping	5/15	265	320	320...340	23
Stereotyping	7/14	258	315	320...340	23
Monotype a	5/15	265	350	330...350	23
Monotype b	8/15	260	360	350...370	25
Monotype c	7/17	280	370	360...380	26
Monotype d	9/19	285	390	380...400	28.5
Monotype e	9.5/15	270	360	350...370	26
Monotype f	9.5/17	280	380	370...390	27.5
Monotype g	10/16	275	370	360...380	27
Regeneration a	9/11	—	—	—	—
Regeneration b	9/12	—	—	—	—
Regeneration c	9/16	—	—	—	—
Support metal a	1/2	310	—	360...380	6
Support metal b	3/5	295	—	340...360	14
Support metal c	5/5	280	—	340...360	16
Typefounding	5.5/28.5	360	—	420...430	29.5

=== Dross ===
Regeneration-metal was melted into the crucible to replace lost tin and antimony through the dross.

Every time type metal is remelted, tin and antimony oxidise. These oxides form on the surface of the crucible and must be removed. After stirring the molten metal, grey powder forms on the surface, the dross, needing to be skimmed. Dross contains recoverable amounts of tin and antimony.

Dross must be processed at specialized companies, in order to extract the pure metals in conditions that would prevent environmental pollution and remain economically feasible.

=== Behaviour of bipolar alloys ===
Pure metal melts and solidifies in a simple manner at a specific temperature. This is not the case with alloys. There we find a range of temperatures with all kinds of different events. The melting temperature of all mixtures is considerably lower than the pure components.

==== Antimony/Lead mixture examples ====
The addition of a small amount of antimony (5% to 6%) to lead will significantly alter the alloy's behavior compared to pure lead: although the melting point of pure antimony is 630 °C, this mixture will be completely molten and a homogeneous fluid even at temperatures as low as 371 °C. Letting this mixture cool the alloy will remain liquid even through 355 °C, the melting point of pure lead. Once the temperature reaches 291 °C, lead crystals will start to form, increasing the cohesion of the liquid alloy. At 252 °C, the mixture will start to fully solidify, during which the temperature will remain constant. Only when the mixture has fully solidified will the temperature start to decrease again.

Using a 10% antimony, 90% lead mixture delays lead crystal formation until approximately 260 °C.

Using a 12% antimony, 88% lead mixture prevents crystal formation entirely, becoming a eutectic. This alloy has a clear melting point, at 252 °C.

Increasing the antimony content beyond 12% will lead to predominantly antimony crystallization.

=== Tri-polar mixtures ===
Adding tin to this bipolar-system complicates the behaviour even further. Some tin enters into the eutectic. A mixture of 4% tin, 12% antimony, and 84% lead solidifies at 240 °C.

Depending from the metals in excess, compared with the eutectic, crystals are formed, depleting the liquid, until the eutectic 4/12 mixture is formed once more.

The 12/20 alloy contains many mixed crystals of tin and antimony, these crystals constitute the hardness of the alloy and the resistance against wear.

Raising the content of antimony cannot be done without adding some tin too. Because the fluidity of the mixture will dramatically diminish when the temperature goes down somewhere in the channels of the machine. Nozzles can be blocked by antimony crystals.

=== Metals used on typecasting machines ===
Eutectic alloys are used on Linotype-machines and Ludlow-casters to prevent blockage of the mould and to ensure continuous trouble-free casting.

Alloys used on Monotype machines tend to contain higher contents of tin, to obtain tougher character. All characters should be able to resist the pressure during printing. This meant an extra investment, but Monotype was an expensive system all the way.

=== Present usage of type metal ===
Competition between mechanical typecasting systems, such as Linotype and Monotype, led to conflicting claims regarding the ideal composition of type metal. Operators of each system frequently disputed the effectiveness of the competing technology.

Monotype machines however can utilize a wide range of different alloys; maintaining a constant and a high production meant a strict standardization of the typemetal in the company, so as to reduce by all means any interruption of the production. Repeated assays were done at regular intervals to monitor the alloy used, since every time the metal is recycled, roughly half a per cent of tin content is lost through oxidation. These oxides are removed with the dross while cleaning the surface of the molten metal.

Nowadays this "battle" has lost its importance, at least for Monotype. The quality of the produced type is far more important. Alloys with a high-content of antimony, and subsequently a high content of tin, can be cast at a higher temperature, and at a lower speed and with more cooling at a Monotype composition or supercaster.

Although care was taken to avoid mixing different types of type metal in shops with different type casting systems, in actual practice this often occurred. Since a Monotype composition caster can cope with a variety of different metal alloys, occasional mixing of Linotype alloy with discarded typefounders alloy has proven its usefulness.

== Contamination of type metals ==
=== Copper ===
Copper has been used for hardening type metal; this metal easily forms mixed crystals with tin when the alloy cools down. These crystals will grow just below the exit opening of the nozzle in Monotype machines, resulting in a total blockage after some time. These nozzles are very difficult to clean, because the hard crystals will resist drilling.

=== Zinc ===
Brass spaces contain zinc, which is extremely counterproductive in type metal. Even a tiny amount — less than 1% — will form a dusty surface on the molten metal surface that is difficult to remove. Characters cast from contaminated type metal such as this are of inferior quality, the solution being to discard and replace with fresh alloy.

Brass and zinc should therefore be removed before remelting. The same applies to aluminium, although this metal will float on top of the melt, and will be easily discovered and removed, before it is dissolved into the lead.

=== Magnesium ===
Magnesium plates are very dangerous in molten lead, because this metal can easily burn and will ignite in the molten lead.

=== Iron ===
Iron is hardly dissolved into type metal, although the molten metal is always in contact with the cast iron surface of the melting pot.

== Historic references to type metals ==
Joseph Moxon, in his Mechanick Exercises, mentions a mix of equal amounts of "antimony" and iron nails.

Paragraph 2. Of making Mettal.

The Metal Founders make Printing Letters of, is Lead hardned with Iron: Thus they chuse stub-Nails for the best Iron to Melt, as well because they are asured stub-Nails are made of good soft and tough Iron, as because (they being in small pieces of Iron) will Melt the sooner. To make the Iron Run, they mingle an equal weight of Antimony (beaten in an Iron-Morter into small pieces) and stub-Nails together. And preparing so many Earthen forty or fifty pounds Melting-pots (made for that purpose to endure the Fire) as they intend to use: They Charge these Pots with the mingeld Iron and Antimony as full as they will hold.

Every time they melt Mettal, they built a new Furnace to melt it in: This Furnace is called an Open Furnace; because the air blows in through all its sides to fan the Fire. They make it of bricks in an open place, as well because the air may have free access to all its sides, as that the vapours of the Antimony (which are obnoxious) may the less offend those that officiate at the Making the Mettal: And also because the violent fire made in the Furnace should not endanger the Firing any adjacent Houses.

— Moxon

The "antimony" here was in fact stibnite, antimony-sulfide (Sb_{2}S_{3}). The iron was burned away in this process, reducing the antimony and at the same time removing the unwanted sulfur. In this way ferro-sulfide was formed, that would evaporate with all the fumes.

The mixture of stibnite and nails was heated red hot in an open-air furnace, until all is molten and finished. The resulting metal can contain up to 9% of iron. Further purification can be done by mixing the hot melt with kitchen-salt, NaCl. After this, red hot lead from another melting pot is added and stirred thoroughly.

Some tin was added to the alloy for casting small characters and narrow spaces, to better fill narrow areas of the mould. The effectiveness of tin for this purpose was well known. The use of tin was sometime minimized to save expenses.

Much of this toxic work was done by child labour.

Hitherto a Man (nay, a Boy) might officiate all this work.

— Moxon

As a supposed antidote to the inhaled toxic metal fumes, the workers were given a mixture of red wine and salad oil:

Now (according to Custom) is Half a Pint of Sack mingled with Sallad Oyl, provided for each Workman to drink; intended or an Antidote against the Poysonous Fumes of the Antimony, and to restore the Spirits that so Violent a Fire and Hard Labour may have exhausted.

— Moxon
