= Hand mould =

Tool used in injection molding and printing

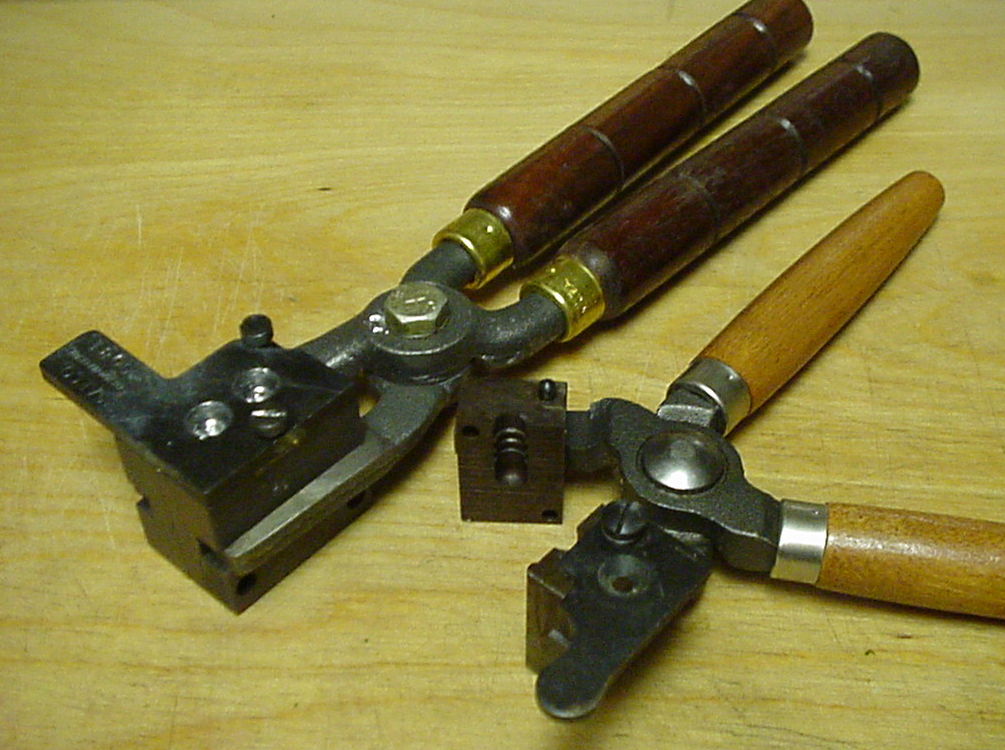
Two bullet molds for lead casting

A hand mold is a simple mold used for low quantity work. It is used in the injection molding and printing industries. It is made by a hand injection molding machine. It is a simple machine which contains a barrel, handle, nozzle, mold and heaters.

== Printing ==
In the printing industry, a hand mold specifically refers to a two-part mold used for casting hand-made type. Inside the mold is a matrix.

In particular, it refers to a system for casting movable type, pioneered by Johannes Gutenberg, which was widely used in the early era of printing in Europe (15th-16th century).

European hand moulds of the same basic feature set were used for type production until the beginning of the 19th century. Stripped down versions, which sometimes lacked wooden insulators, were used by matrix makers (specifically justifiers) until the end of hot metal type casting in the late 20th century.

In this method, the type was made by driving a right-reading punch into a bar of soft metal (typically of brass) known as a matrix, such that a letter-shaped cavity remained. The matrix, distorted by the punching process, was then straightened and aligned for casting in a process known as justification. Then this matrix would be held in the lower part of the mold, the upper part would close on it, and molten type metal would be poured into the cavity. Using the hand mold, the printer could quickly make any additional type they might need.

== Injection molding ==
In injection molding, hand molds refer to simple molds that have no provision for heat, cooling, or ejection. This means when a hand mold is cycled universal heating plates are required to warm the molds and the molds must be removed after each cycle to remove the moldings. This drastically increases the cycle time, which limits it to short runs, but to offset this is the low cost of the mold. They are usually single cavity molds, but may be multi-cavity if the molding is quite small. They are usually only of a two or three plate design because of the simplicity of the parts. If only a short run is required then the molds may be made from aluminum or brass, but if more parts are required then they are made from conventional steels.

== Bullet casting ==
Hand cast bullets remain popular with the handloading, muzzleloading and small custom ammunition loading communities. In a tradition dating back to the beginning of firearms, molds matched to the bore (and the chamber for breech loading weapons) are custom made for each weapon. Anywhere from one to six cavities are carved into the molding block, along with appropriate gates and sprues. As the blocks are now usually made out of aluminum, which does not allow lead alloys to stick, only a small amount of parting compound is needed.
