= Museum of Typography =

Typography museum in Crete

Coordinates: 35.4800°N 24.0661°E

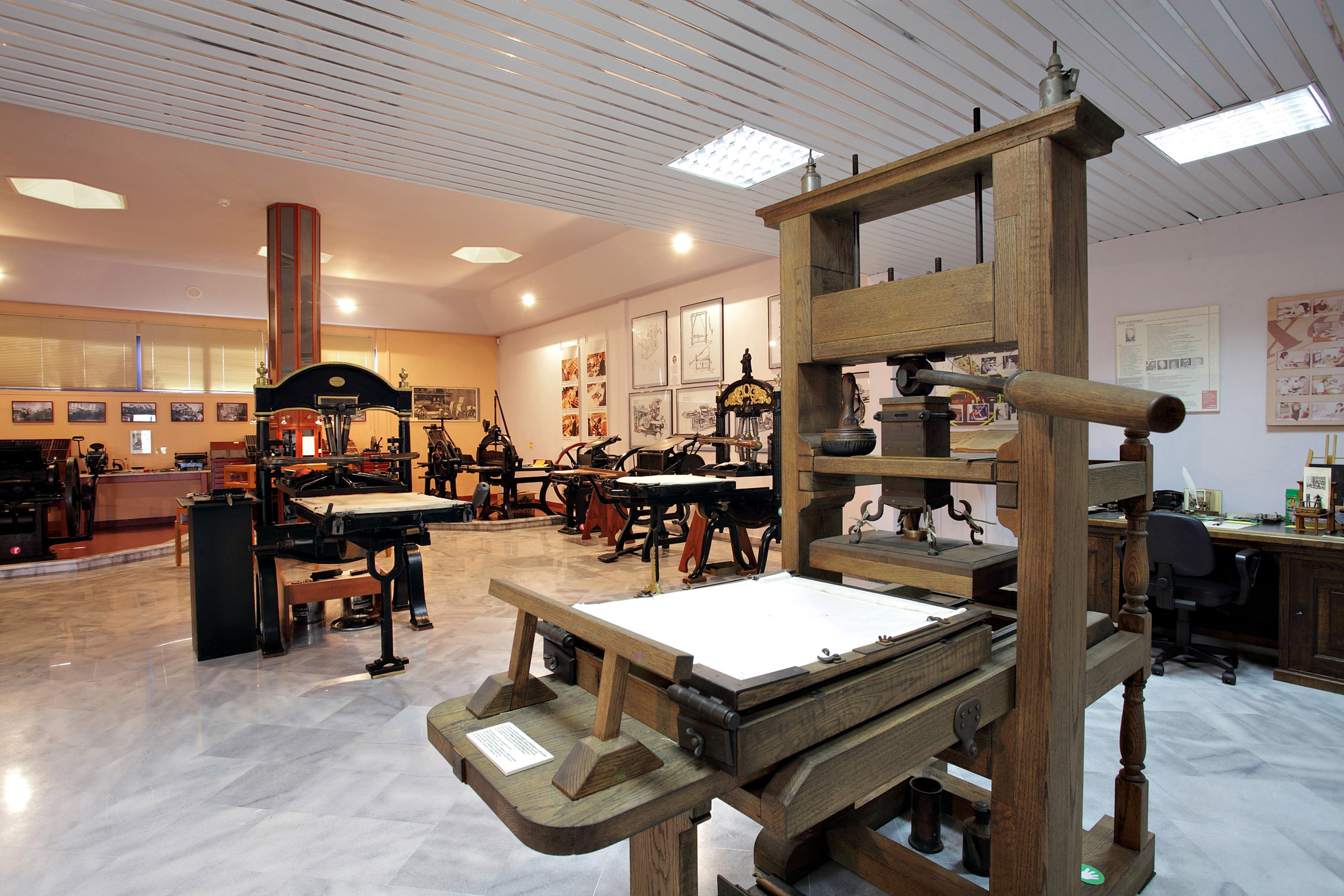
Cast-iron printing presses from the 19th century behind a replica of a wooden press from the days of Gutenberg in the Museum of Typography

The Museum of Typography is a Greek museum of typography and printing located near Chania, Crete, at the Park of Small Industries in Souda. It was founded by Yannis Garedakis, owner and founder of the local newspaper Haniotika Nea, with the support of his wife Eleni. The museum started as a small private collection next to the newspaper's printing facilities and first opened its doors to the public in 2005.

A few years later, in 2012, a new wing was added, presenting various techniques related to typography. In 2015 another hall was inaugurated, along with the museum shop and a small coffee shop. At the last hall, through selected rare books, newspapers, engravings and lithographs from the 16th–19th centuries, visitors have the opportunity to see and learn more about the turbulent history of Crete. Now, the museum covers an area of about 1.400 square meters.

Through the interactive tour, visitors come to understand the course of typography from the Middle Ages up to today. All visitors are encouraged to print at printing presses of the 19th century, while videos explain how many of the techniques in the exhibits operate.

Alongside, the museum organises and hosts cultural events all year long, such as conferences, book presentations, theatrical plays, musical events, and an international poster contest about typography.

Since 2012 the Typography Museum has been a member of the Association of European Printing Museums (AEPM) and in 2017 it hosted the annual general meeting and conference of the association. In 2016 the Museum of Typography was nominated for the European Museum of the Year Award. In 2020 it became a member of the European Route of Industrial Heritage, by the Council of Europe.

== The collections ==
The main hall of the museum contains two elaborate cast-iron printing presses of the beginning of the 19th century; a copy of Gutenberg’s wooden printing press; foot-operated printing presses from Germany, the Netherlands, Switzerland and Greece; and smaller, hand-operated Boston-type printing presses. There are typesetting benches from Gutenberg's time to the beginning of the 20th century, with two examples of linotype and monotype typesetting machines. Printing techniques such as lithography, offset, wood engraving, copper engraving and silk screen printing are presented in detail in specially designed showcases; another special exhibit is the presentation of the Braille writing method for the blind, a donation by the Lighthouse for the Blind of Greece organization.

Large flatbed printing presses of the 19th century dominate the area of the new wing and the amphitheatre, while another one, dating from the middle of the 20th century, is located in the main hall.

Two exhibitions showing the history of writing and the evolution of typography, through the artistic view of the graphic designer and printer Antonis Papantonopoulos, are housed in the semi-floor and the ground floor of the new wing. Traditional workshops for lithography, silk screen, bookbinding and stamp making are also in the new wing, as are more modern exhibits presenting the development of graphic arts.

Rare editions from the 16th century onwards – especially from Venice – Greek and foreign newspapers from the early 19th century, maps, lithographs, woodcuts and etchings are presented in the last hall of the museum, leaving visitors an aftertaste that connects typography with the turbulent history of Crete.

More rare books and periodicals, as well as precious Greek and foreign books about typography, printing, the Press and graphic arts can be found in the museum library, along with a collection of old typewriters and polygraphs.

All the exhibits have explanatory texts in English and in Greek regarding their use, origin and date of manufacture or operation.

== Education ==
Every year, more than 5,000 students of primary and secondary schools, universities and colleges from all over Greece visit the museum – especially those studying such subjects as art and design, graphic arts, history, and typography. These "young printers" have the opportunity to print on the authentic 19th-century printing presses and discover the secrets of printing. The educational programmes are approved by the Greek Ministry of Education.
