= Digital print matrix =

A digital print matrix is the digital state from which a print art object can be instanced with original intent.

The traditional term print matrix is the physical surface from which an image is printed, woodblock, plate, stone or screen. Although these may in themselves be produced digitally they comprise a traditional (physical) matrix. A digital matrix however is a repository of material which, stored digitally, is combined by the artist's hand and instanced with original intent; Philip George's “fluid diary” providing an early example. Technically the digital matrix comprises stable digital storage mechanisms (which retain the data when switched off) rather than volatile random access memory. Conceptually as there is no need for this storage to be in the physical presence of the artist then online and remote storage (including the Internet) may form as a whole or in part the digital matrix.
