= Hot metal typesetting =

Mechanical analog method for text composition

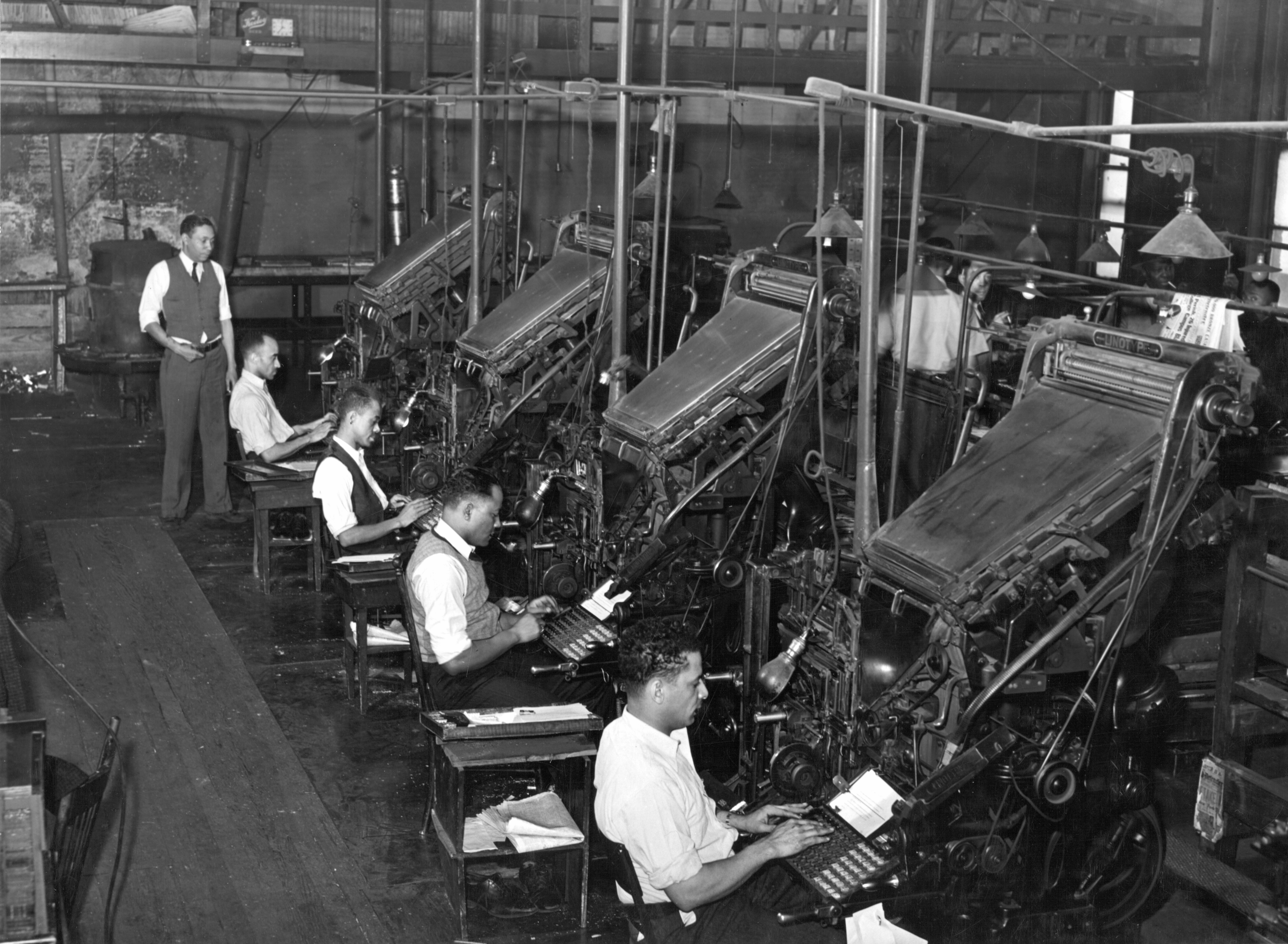
Row of Linotype operators at the Chicago Defender newspaper, 1941

In printing and typography, hot metal typesetting (also called mechanical typesetting, hot lead typesetting, hot metal, and hot type) is a technology for typesetting text in letterpress printing. This method injects molten type metal into a mold that has the shape of one or more glyphs. The resulting sorts or slugs are later used to press ink onto paper. Normally the typecasting machine would be controlled by a keyboard or by a paper tape.

It was the standard technology used for mass-market printing from the late nineteenth century until the arrival of phototypesetting (also called cold type) and then electronic processes in the 1950s to 1980s.

== History ==
Hot metal typesetting was developed in the late nineteenth century as a development of conventional cast metal type. The technology had several advantages: it reduced labour since type sorts did not need to be slotted into position manually, and each casting created crisp new type for each printing job. In the case of Linotype machines, each line was cast as a robust continuous block (hence "line o'type") which was useful for rapid newspaper printing.

== Types of typesetting ==
Two different approaches to mechanising typesetting were independently developed in the late 19th century. One, known as the Monotype composition caster system, produced texts with the aid of perforated paper-ribbons. Each character was cast separately. These machines could also produce texts in "large-composition" up to 24 point.

The Super-caster, another machine produced by Monotype, was similar in function to the Thompson, Barth, pivotal and other casters but designed to produce single type (including even larger sizes) for hand setting.

The other approach was to cast complete lines as one slug, usually comprising a whole line of text.

Of this system there were at least five manufacturers:

- Linotype
- Intertype Corporation
- the Typograph, produced in Germany
- Ludlow Typograph
- The Monoline, a very basic machine

The Linotype and similar Intertype machines came out with paper tape and electronic automation near the end of their lifecycles, which allowed for the news wire services to send breaking news to remote newspaper offices for prompt setting into late editions.

While the other machines were operated by (non-QWERTY) keyboards, in the Ludlow Typograph the matrices for each line were assembled in a stick by hand. This machine was able to cast display body sizes that other mechanical composition systems were unable to produce. In this way headings could be produced to complement text produced on other machines. It also used the same alloy as Linotype machines, so was a useful adjunct to page makeup for newspapers as, when a print run was completed, all the metal could be remelted at once, without having to be separated or the type from the headings redistributed back into case.

The success of these machines lay in different fields. The Monotype caster was more popular for bookwork that required the ability to make manual corrections and edits while the slug casting systems found success in newspaper production, where speed of production and 'make ready' for print was essential.

Another essential difference between Monotype and the "slug"-producing machines is that a Monotype machine functions with a minimal set of matrices. Each character needs one matrix. Linecasters cannot function this way, and these systems need quite large magazines of matrices to be able to set a complete line of text with the usual character repetitions. Indeed, the nominal 90-channel magazine of a linecaster really has 91 total channels, with the first two channels allocated to the lower case 'e', and with these matrices being alternately selected from channel 0 or channel 1, for alternate lines of cast type.

Additionally, Monotype must use a punched paper tape, and the "reading frame" is always backwards (right-to-left) in order to achieve justification, as justification is not an inherent capability of the machine (however, "flush left" is an inherent capability). Whereas Linotype may use a punched paper tape, although this option is seldom-used outside of daily newspapers, and whether a tape is used, or not, the "reading frame" is always forwards (left-to-right), with justification being an inherent capability of the machine (and, "flush right", "centered" and "flush left" may be very easily accommodated manually, or automatically using a "quadder" attachment).

=== Linotype ===
The key feature of the Linotype is the use of molds which circulate through the machine in its various stages of operation. One type is a space band (a special two-part sliding wedge) and the other is a letter matrix made of brass. The matrices are stored in one or more magazines on top of the machine (providing the operator with a choice of fonts; these can also be exchanged with other extra magazines as desired) while the space bands are stored in a box closer to the keyboard.

Once a key is pressed, the matrix passes through what is known as the ‘assembler front’, down past a rotating fiber reinforced wheel (known as the star wheel) and into the ‘assembling elevator’ which serves the same purpose as the hand compositor's stick. When the space band key near the keyboard is pressed, one of the space bands drops out of the box and almost directly into the assembling elevator. The assembling elevator (or more commonly just the ‘assembler’) is adjustable for different lengths of line (in picas).

Once the line approaches its correct length, the operator is made aware of this by a bell or other indicator. If the line is ‘loose’ or too short, there is too much ‘white space’ for the space band wedges to fill out the line, and the matrices could possibly turn sidewise or fail to seal against each other as the machine prepares for the casting operation. If the line is ‘tight’ or too long, the elevator carrying the matrices and space bands will not seat properly in front of the mold slot. Both the Linotype and Intertype machines have two important safeties that act during the casting operation – the ‘pump stop’, which comes into play on loose lines, and the ‘vise automatic', which comes into play on tight lines. Both scenarios, if not stopped by these safety features, usually result in a “squirt” of molten type metal, encasing the matrices and the elevator in metal in the process. Not only is it time-consuming to clean up after a squirt, a tight line usually has not come down far enough to mate with the slots on the mold face, resulting in damage to the matrices. Therefore, it is considered very poor form for an operator (or the machinist who cared for the machine) to permit this to happen.

When the line is assembled to the correct length, the operator presses down on a lever which raises the assembling elevator up into the delivery channel and starts the automatic casting cycle. The delivery channel transfers the matrices out of the assembler and into the first elevator. The first elevator then descends to a position in front of the mold, and if the elevator has not descended fully by the time the machine starts the process of aligning the matrices (most often caused by a ‘tight’ line), the first of the two safeties, the vise automatic, brings the machine to a full stop before the supporting lugs on the matrices are crushed by the mold. Once the matrices are in proper position, two actions take place in sequence: the matrices are aligned vertically and face-wise while a bar rises from below to force the movable sleeves on the space bands upwards to cause them to fill out the line to the exact width of the mold. If the justification bar has made a full cycle and the line is still not fully justified, the second safety, the pump stop, prevents the plunger in the metal pot from going down. The space bands were an important feature of this machine, providing automatic justification of each line by equally adjusting the white space between each word. Since the type used was proportional and not fixed in width, solving this justification problem mechanically was very important. Some later models had a feature that permitted the lines to be cast with the alignment to either left, right or centered. Operators running earlier models would use special ‘blank’ matrices (in four sizes) to manually create the proper amount of whitespace beyond the space bands’ range.

With the matrices aligned and the space bands set to the correct measure, the machine then ‘locks up’ the line with great force and the plunger injects the molten type metal into the space created by the mold cavity and the assembled line. The machine then separates the mold disk (carrying the freshly cast slug), the metal pot, and the first elevator. The mold disk then turns to present the line at the ejecting position, in the process passing by a knife that trims the base of the slug to type height (0.918″ on US machines). The slug is then forced through an adjustable pair of knives to trim the slug to the proper body height before sliding down into a ‘galley’ of finished lines next to the operator. Depending on the model of machine, the mold disk could have four (standard), six, or two molds, giving the operator his choice of line lengths and body sizes.

As the mold disk is turning, the first elevator simultaneously rises to its upper position and the space bands and matrices are vertically aligned in preparation for the second transfer. The matrices have a series of teeth in a V-shaped notch on top, and as the transfer is completed, the matrices slide onto the second elevator bar which carries the matrices by these V-shaped notches. The space bands, having no such notches, remain in the second transfer channel and are soon gathered by two levers and pushed back into the space band box. While the space bands are being pushed into their box, the second elevator continues rising towards the distributing mechanism at the top of the machine, which returns the molds to their proper places in the magazine. At the top of the machine, a lever (the distributor shifter) moves left to get in position to push the incoming line of matrices off the second elevator and into the distributor box. This mechanism feeds the matrices at precise intervals such that they travel between three rotating screws. Each matrix is carried along a notched bar between the three screws until the notches on the bar and matrix match, whereupon the matrix drops down into its proper channel in the magazine.

It was a source of pride for trained operators to boast of being able to ‘hang’ a line – to keep a line waiting in the delivery channel while the machine was casting the previous line and the operator was composing the next one.

The metal pot was kept filled by the operator tossing in small ingots of type metal every few lines, or later, by mechanical feeders that carry large ingots of type metal (and which often carried two ‘pigs’ at a time to be consumed in turn, the operator hanging a fresh one when one was consumed). These feeders are actuated by various methods (by cam, either elevator, or distributor shifter), but the result is the same – the ingots are fed little by little into the pot, keeping it filled to the correct level.

From time to time, the slug galley is transferred to the composing table to be set in the form, and once the press run is completed and the slugs removed from the form, they are tossed into the ‘hell box’ for remelting into new ingots. At intervals the lead is remelted and the oxidized metal (dross) skimmed off. As part of this process, ‘plus metal’ is added in the form of small ingots to replenish that portion of the alloyed metals that was lost by the formation of dross (by oxidization of the metal in the machine's pot or during the remelting stage). The type metal is poured into ingot molds – small molds for manually feeding the metal pots or larger molds for the metal feeders. (In the latter case, special attention must be given the ‘eye’ end as it has to support the weight of the entire ingot. Failure often results in it dropping into the pot and splashing molten metal everywhere.)

Funded largely by the Ridder newspaper interests, the Intertype Corporation developed (c. 1914) a compatible version of the Linotype machine when the patents ran out and it became quite popular as well. This led to a long-lasting legal fight by the Mergenthaler Linotype Company (who eventually lost).

Various methods were used to power the Linotype / Intertype machines, the most common being a fractional horsepower motor, one wired for single-phase 60 Hz alternating current eventually becoming the default offering. To accommodate the customers' requirements, motors were also built to be powered from direct current, 25 Hz AC, or 50 Hz AC circuits. Also, motors wound for various polyphase circuits (two-phase, 3-phase, wye, delta, etc.) were made available for the customers as well. In a few cases, where electricity was not available, it was possible to drive the machine by a belt connected to a line shaft.

Initially, the metal pot was heated by gas (whether natural or 'manufactured'), but an electric pot was later developed and which became a standard option. As with the motors, the control machinery for the metal pot heaters was produced in a variety of voltages and in direct or alternating current versions. For locations with access to neither gas or electricity, the gas-fired pot could be fitted with a burner kit to allow the use of kerosene or other 'white gas' fuels.

Thus, regardless of the power sources available (within reason), it was possible to install a Linotype (or Intertype) machine in almost any newspaper office, whether in a remote mountain community or a downtown office in an urban metropolis.

=== Typograph and Monoline ===
These machines were bought out by Linotype, to minimize competition.

=== Ludlow ===
A manual linecasting solution known as the Ludlow Typograph also met with success because it was able to cast display type sizes that other mechanical composition systems were unable to produce.

The Ludlow consisted of a very heavy metal table with a flat top about waist high and a depressed slot into which a "stick" was inserted. Underneath was a pot of molten type metal and a plunger. The stick was used to hand compose the lines of type, typically headlines in 18 point or larger with 72 point commonly being available, but the machine could cast type from 4pt to 600pt without a mould change. This was from brass matrix stored in cases on either side of the Ludlow. The cases were not the traditional "California Job Cases" used to set body type, but simpler alphabetically arranged wooden or metal cases, each one containing a given font in a specific size and style such as bold face, italic or condensed. The metal type cabinets were built with inclined drawers for easy access to the matrices.

After a line of type was assembled into the stick a special blocking slug was inserted to seal the end. Then the stick was placed mold side down into the slot on the table, a clamp locked down to securely hold the stick and the Ludlow activated. The plunger would snap down into the pot with considerable force, injecting molten type metal into the mold at a high speed to ensure the mold was filled before the metal solidified. If the stick was not properly filled out or mounted firmly, or the special terminating block was forgotten, a dreaded "splash" would result, often encasing the operator's toes in molten lead and leaving a mess that needed to be peeled off the Ludlow surfaces. Operators were encouraged to wear heavy boots with steel toes and be quick at removing one. It was also not uncommon for some of the type metal to be projected up onto the ceiling, no matter the height. As with the Linotype / Intertype machines, the Ludlow machines were often fitted with metal feeders to keep the pot filled to optimum level.

Towards the end of its life as a common backshop type setter, the Ludlow was often joined by the "Super Surfacer" a specially designed surface plane that would smooth the surface of the freshly cast type and ensure it was exactly type high. A Ludlow slug was just the letters overhanging a central spine about 12 points wide (T-shaped viewed from the end). It needed to be bolstered by Elrod slugs on either side for support. The number of slugs above and below the central spine could adjust the white space above and below the type making it a very flexible system for large type.

The Elrod was a machine used to cast rules and spacing material (leading) of a specific width: 1, 1 1/2, 2, 3, 4, 6, 12, 18, 24, 30, or 36 point. This was used extensively in page layout and line spacing, that is, adjusting the white space between paragraphs and any other area when small bits of white space were needed. Large areas of white space were created by wooden or later metal blocks called 'furniture'. Smaller odd areas were filled with square or rectangular blocks in various point sizes called quads.

All these line-casting machines used various alloys near the eutectic point and which typically consisted of approximately 4% tin and 12% antimony and the balance being lead. These alloys were proportioned such that the type metal would solidify as rapidly as possible at the lowest possible freezing point.

=== Monotype ===
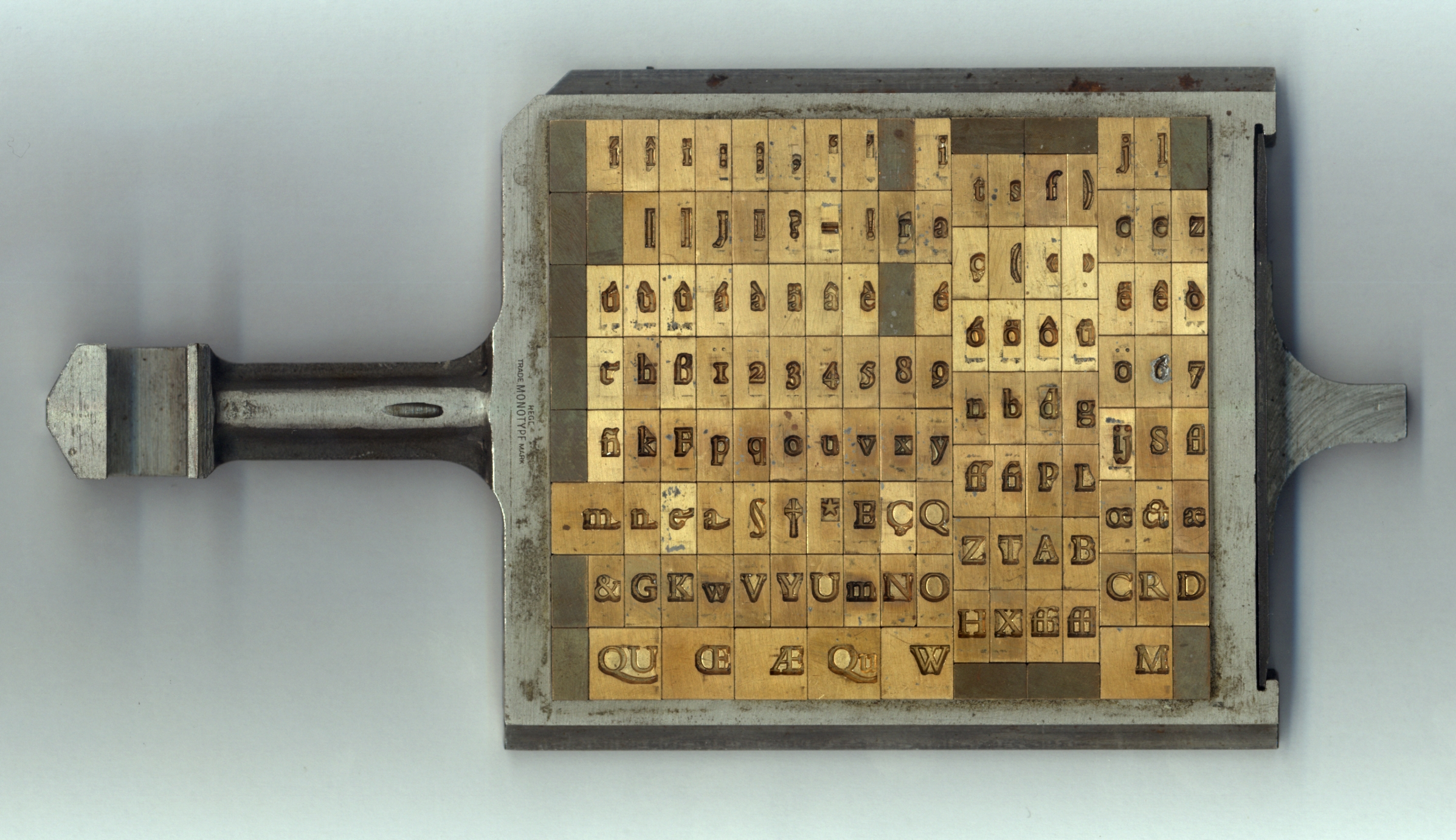
A Monotype composition case showing bronze matrices struck from steel punches

The Monotype System took a different direction in hot metal typesetting, with the ability of the Composition Caster to cast loose type using a paper tape-operated automatic casting machine. The paper tape would be first generated on a keyboard and then used to cast the type; the tape could be stored for future casting for subsequent editions. This was a popular system for book work. Text was produced completely aligned, with all spaces in each line exactly the same width. Corrections and complex work could be done on the text by hand after the bulk of the text had been set by machine. The Super Caster and Orphan Annie were used to cast fonts of loose type for hand setting as well as spacing material and patterned rules.

This type was most times made of an alloy (8-10% tin, 15-20% antimony) slightly harder than the line casting alloys but was not as hard as the foundry type used for hand setting of loose letters. This allowed reasonable print runs or conversion to stereotypes for longer print runs. But these machines could produce type with all possible alloys, when needed.

The used type, like the slugs from line casters, was re-melted when no longer needed. Each time remelting caused some loss of tin and antimony, through oxidation. This loss needed to be monitored and compensated.

The Monotype Corporation survived the demise of the hot metal typesetting era by selling digital type.

== Transition ==
Towards the end of its life, hot metal composition in newspapers was kept alive by the proof press. As each page was set and locked up, it was moved on a turtle (a rolling table with an accurately flat steel surface) to the manual proof press, where it was hand inked and a single very high quality proof was pulled. This proof could then be photographed and converted to a negative.

Black paper was inserted before the proof was photographed for each of the photos on the final page to create clear windows in the negative. The separately made halftones would be taped into these clear windows on the negative. This negative could then be used to expose the photosensitized printing plate for an offset press. In this way the heavy investment in hot metal typesetting could be adapted to the newer offset technology during a transition period.

Another synergy and transition mechanism was using paper tapes made for TTS systems (linotype) and monotype tapes directly by the photo typesetter system.

These tapes could be read and processed by many, maybe most optical setting systems. This allows avoiding actual use of metal, while preserving some of the value and investment in the "typesetting" and communication side of hot metal. Such systems were widely used in the later years of hot metal, and optical typesetting systems kept supporting and further developing TTS standard, alongside similar systems for most of the optical typesetting era.

== Comparison to successors ==
The nature of text printed via the hot-metal method is notably different from that produced by the phototypesetting processes that followed it. As the lead type used to print (letterpress) a page had been directly formed from the type matrix, a good fidelity to the original was achieved. Phototypesetting suffered (at least in its early days) from many problems relating to optical distortion and misalignment. These disappointing results were a thorn in the sides of many authors and readers (especially of complex or mathematical texts that had many small sub- and superscripts). A desire to re-create the aesthetic qualities of hot lead spurred Donald Knuth to create an early general-purpose digital typesetting programs, TeX.

Although not technically typesetting, stereotyping (electrotype or nickeltype) could be used to cast a reproduction of an entire typeset page (or pages imposed in a forme) using a mold made with an impression using flong (similar to papier-mâché). The ensuing casting could be made curved for use on a rotary press or flat for the slower flat-bed presses. This technique was often used in newspaper production.
