= John Raphael Rogers =

American inventor

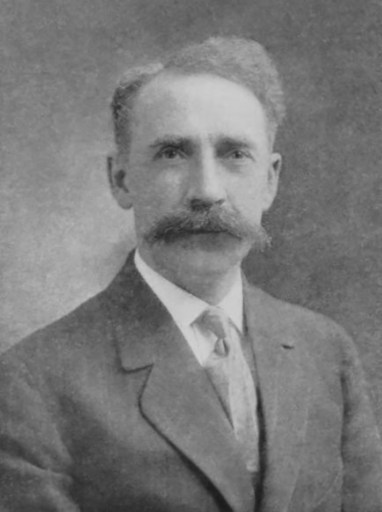
- Born: December 11, 1856; Roseville, Illinois, US
- Died: February 18, 1934 (aged 77); Brooklyn, New York, US
- Education: Oberlin College
- Occupations: Teacher, inventor

John Raphael Rogers (December 11, 1856 – February 18, 1934) invented the Typograph, a form of typesetting machine. The patent for setting a line of type in a single bar of metal was held by the Linotype company, so Rogers was unable to market his invention in the US. He sold the patent to a German company, and it was used successfully in Germany for some years.

== Biography ==
John Raphael Rogers was born in Roseville, Illinois on December 11, 1856, to John A. Rogers and Elizabeth Embree Rogers. He graduated from Oberlin College with a bachelor's degree in 1875. He worked as a school teacher and school superintendent until 1886, after which he worked on his inventions full time. He received a patent for the Rogers Typograph in 1888.

He died at his home in Brooklyn on February 18, 1934.
