= Monotype system =

Typesetting system

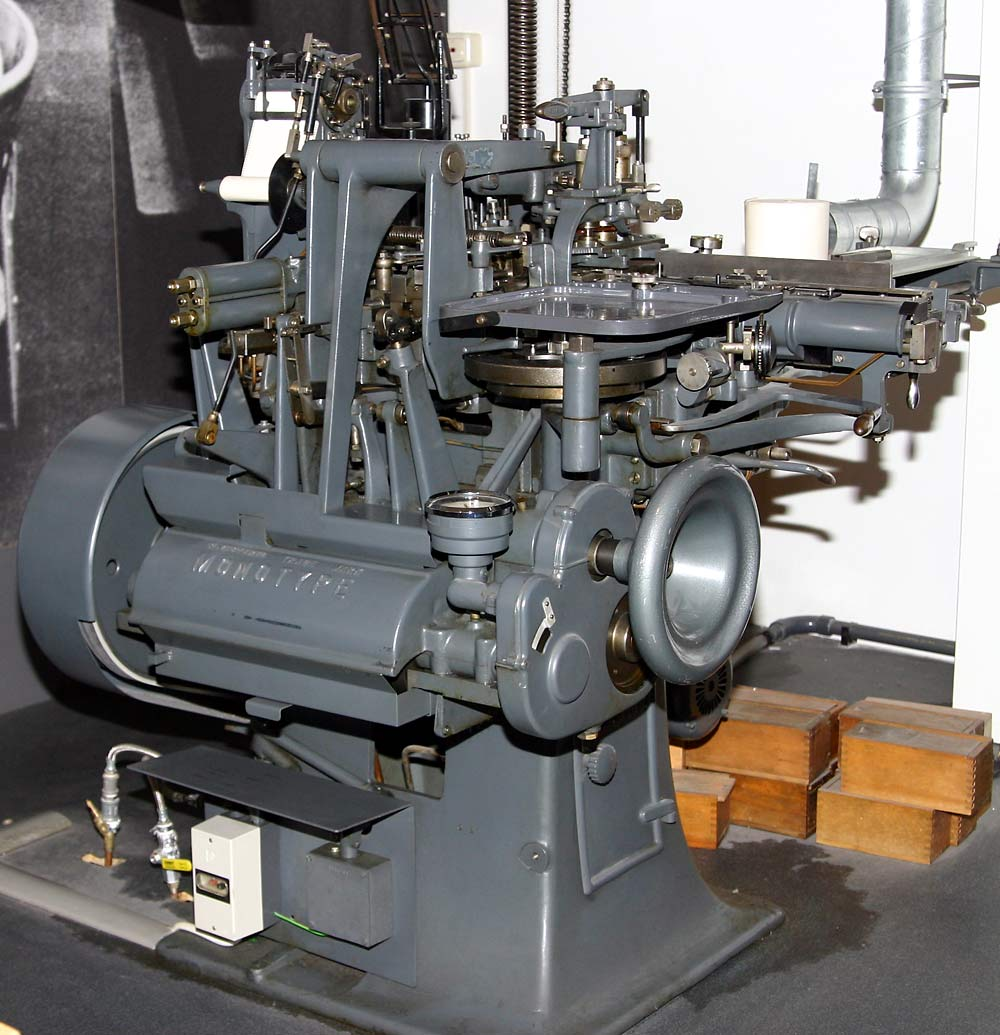
A Monotype caster

The Monotype system is a system for printing by hot-metal typesetting from a keyboard. The two most significant differences from the competing Linotype machine are that

- it is divided into two machines, the Monotype keyboard and the Monotype caster, which communicate by perforated paper tape. It is not necessary to have the same number of each machine.
- the Monotype caster casts individual letters, which are assembled into lines in a fashion similar to classical movable type. This requires a more complex high-speed water-cooled casting mold, but only requires one matrix per possible character.

A Monotype operator enters text on a Monotype keyboard, on which characters are arranged in the QWERTY arrangement of a conventional typewriter, but with this arrangement repeated multiple times. Thus, the typesetter moves his hands from one group of keys to another to type uppercase or lowercase, small capitals, italic uppercase or italic lowercase, and so on.

When the text nears the right margin, a drum on the keyboard indicates codes which are punched on the paper tape with special keys to indicate how the line is to be justified. The tape is then taken to a Monotype caster, which reads the tape and produces a column of justified type from which the text entered on the keyboard can be printed.

== History ==
In 1885, the American inventor Tolbert Lanston applied for a patent on a typesetting system that included the basic Monotype keyboard, but which produced a printing surface through a cold-stamping method. In 1890, he filed a subsequent patent, which covered the Monotype caster.

In 1897 the Lanston Monotype Corporation opened a branch in England, which later became the Monotype Corporation, an independent company.

== Design ==
=== Keyboard ===
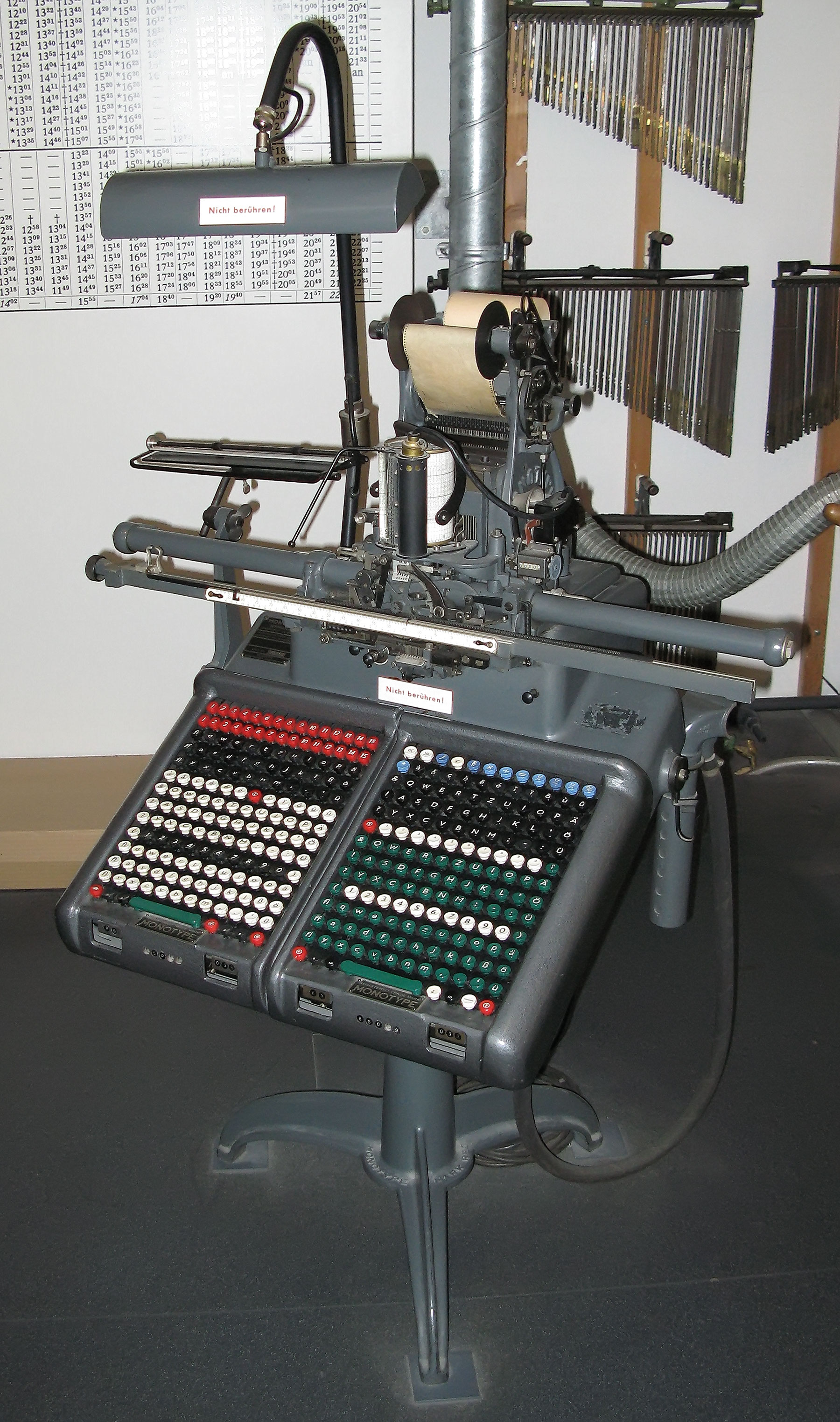
A Monotype keyboard; the tape reel being produced is at the top

A Monotype keyboard allows a keyboard operator to prepare a perforated paper tape, called ribbon, that will direct the casting of type separately from its actual casting. The keyboard on which the operator types is removable, as is a set of keybars under the keys; the keybars, corresponding to each key, determine which holes will be punched in the tape. During operation, two sets of keys and keybars are placed in two side-by-side trays on the keyboard. The keybars are adjustable, so that the coding of the keys can be changed. Keytops also are replaceable, so that the keyboard can be reconfigured.

=== Matrix-case ===
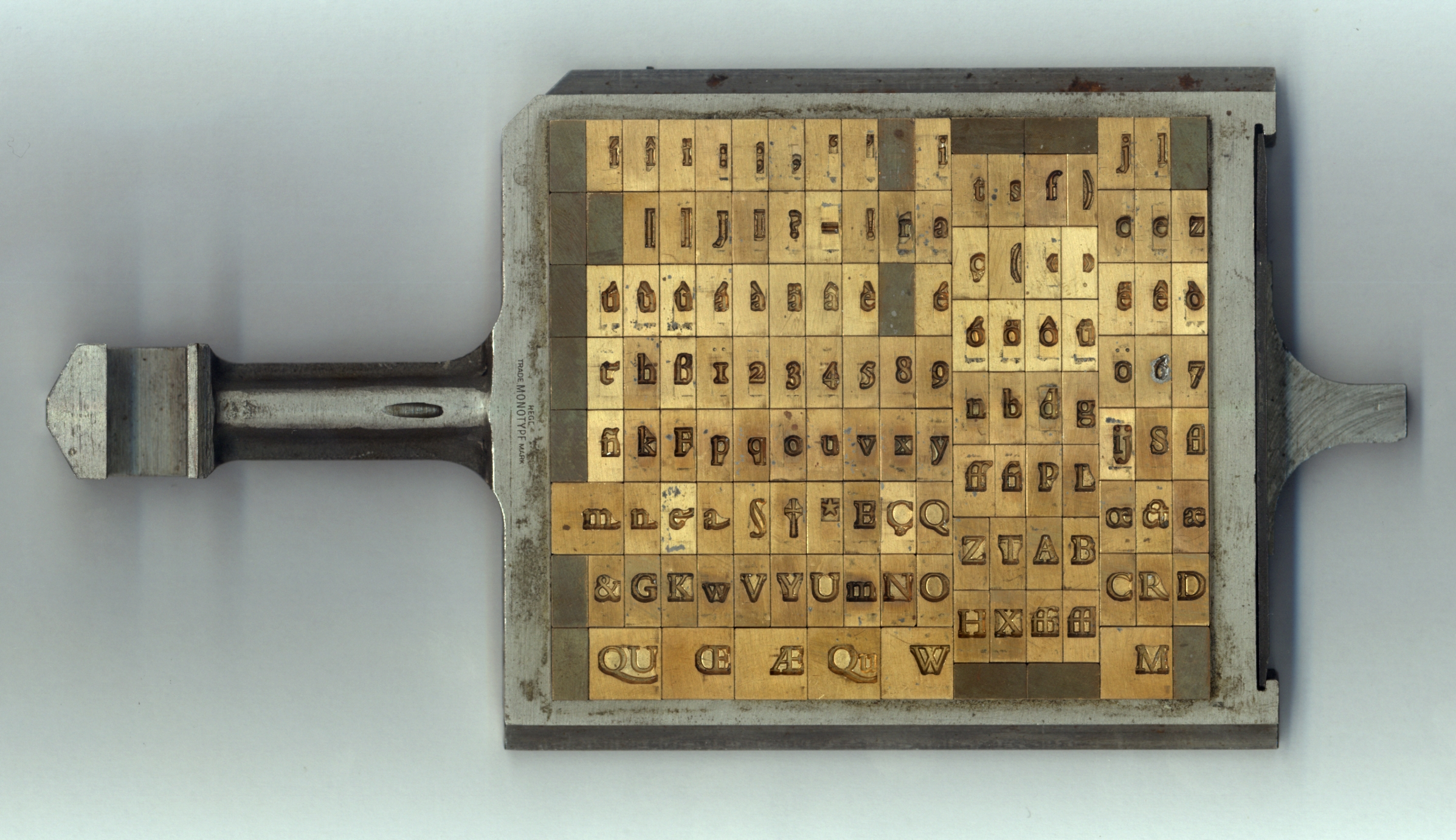
A Monotype large-composition matrix case, this one for 16-point Bembo

For the Monotype caster to produce types with the shape of the desired character on their face, a matrix with that character incised in it must be moved to the top of the mold in which the slug will be cast. This is achieved by placing a rectangular array of bronze matrices, each of which is 0.2 inch square, in a holder, called the matrix-case. Originally, it contained 225 matrices, in 15 rows and 15 columns; later versions of the Monotype caster expanded that first to 15 rows and 17 columns (255 matrices), and then to 16 rows and 17 columns (272 matrices).

For type sizes larger than about 12-point, a "large composition" system existed, which used matrices 0.2×0.4, 0.4×0.2, and/or 0.4×0.4 inches to accommodate the larger character sizes. The matrix cases for this system held fewer matrices, often allowing only a single variant on the face, whereas the standard matrix cases had room for several variants (such as roman, bold, italic, small capitals) or a mix of several type faces.

The paper tape that controls casting contains 14 columns of holes that indicate the row of the matrix-case to be used, and 14 columns of holes that indicate the column of the matrix-case to be used. Originally, one row and one column of the matrix-case were indicated by the absence of a hole, and each of the others was indicated by a single hole. When the matrix-case was enlarged, some columns or rows of the matrix-case were indicated by combinations of two holes instead.

The row of the matrix-case on which the matrix for a character is contained also indicated the width of that character. This was one major reason why reconfiguring the keyboard needed to be easy, since the arrangement of characters in the matrix case would be varied with the typeface. A part called the wedge indicated the width corresponding to each row of the matrix-case.

=== Mould ===
The mould is one of the unique parts of the system, and together with the matrix-case, is the centrepiece of the caster. Its job is to locate under the matrix to case and shape the body of the sort, and then deliver it to the typecarrier, and eventually the galley.

In the most simplistic view, the mould is a square pipe, with a conical funnel at its bottom and the selected matrix at the top.

In detail, the mould does quite a lot more than just being a square pipe. There is a mechanism to control its width, both for casting characters and spaces. The width is set by special parts called wedges. Those are readjusted for each cast, thus controlling the width of the mould, thus the width of the sort or space.

This wedge position depends on the row of the currently cast character in the matrix case, so by setting the letter to be cast, the width of the mould is also set. Just for spaces, there is a second wedge with finer steps, used to set their precise width for each line, so it's "mathematically" justified.

For the casting operation, the mould width is set, and it is placed above the conical metal injector, and below the matrix. The injector is raised and fits into the conical funnel at the base of the mould, ensuring precise positioning. At the same time, a pin is pressed to a round depression on the top of the selected matrix, ensuring its precise positioning and tight contact with the mould.

The metal is injected with some pressure, and almost immediately the injector and the pin retreat, releasing the mould to rush to the ejection site and back, to have its wedges adjust for the next cast, and releasing the matrix-case to position the next character to be cast.

Another part of the mould is called the crossblock. While the metal is injected into the mould, it seals the room where the character is formed. When the cast is done, the now solid metal needs to leave the mould. The crossblock will move to the side of the machine. When the crossblock travels: starting above the metal injector and below the matrix, it travels to the ejection site, shaving the foot of the sort as it moves.

When the crossblock is at its maximum, the mould-blade will push the sort inside the typecarrier. This piece moves in front the mould-opening and takes the sort in. A spring inside the typecarrier holds the sort such that it can not turn. The crossblock and the typecarrier move back, and the character is pushed inside the character-channel. At the same moment the next sort is cast.

The typecarrier is firmly connected to the crossblock of the mould, and it controls the movement of the crossblock.

Inside the character-channel the line is built, until it is finished, and a combined 0075-0005 code instructs the caster to move the finished line at the galley.

This all takes less than half a second – the caster casts 140 sorts a minute or better in all but the earliest models, depending on the size of the font cast.

The mould is water-cooled, through special passages, or cavities. This enables it to cast at a high rate without getting too hot to continue. Special mould oil is used to lubricate the moving pieces inside of the mould and prevent buildup of carbon particles due to the very high temperatures inside the mould.

=== Justification ===
The width of each sort cast on the Monotype varied from 4 to 18 units. (A special attachment could reduce the minimum to 3 units.) The maximum width of 18 units corresponded to one em, the set width of the typeface. Thus, if a typeface was described as "12 set", 18 units would correspond to 12 points (one pica).

The width of the spaces in each line is further adjusted by a second wedge, detailed below, to adjust the line mathematically. The setting for the space width is punched to the tape by the keyboard, once the line is done. Since the tape is played backwards for casting, the caster reads this setting before casting any of the actual spaces for this line.

When printing tabular text, such as timetables, directories, catalogs, etc., the second wedge is not used, and the typesetter uses fixed-width spaces, called quads, such that each row begins at a fixed location. Using quads allows the typesetter to bring the line length to an integral multiple of the set width, and then count "em-quads" (full set-width quads) to the beginning of the next row.

While the set size was normally equal to the maximum character height, this was not always true: some typefaces could be somewhat wider or narrower than the standard, with many typefaces modified to be slightly wider in smaller sizes. It is also possible to set a font slightly tighter or looser for special typographic effect. The set size could be varied in units of 1/4 point.

Thus, while the Monotype unit system was normally described as one of 18 units to the em, it was 18 units to the em of the set size, not necessarily the em of the actual type size in use.

When text was typed on the Monotype keyboard, the keyboard kept track of the number of units taken up by the characters in the line, and also the number of justifying spaces in the line. When the right margin was approached, this information was indicated to the operator on a rotating drum on the keyboard. As part of finishing a line of text, the operator used two rows of special keys on the keyboard to punch this information on the tape.

In order that the Monotype caster would know ahead of time how wide to make the spaces in a given line of text, the tape is read by the caster in reverse: the last code punched is read first, and the first code punched is read by the caster last. The caster reads this width first, so it knows at what width to cast the justifying spaces, until the "end-line" code (the very first thing punched) is read at last.

Reading in reverse order also makes it simple to handle errors: when the typesetter makes an error, there is no need to alter the paper tape. Instead, the typesetter types a "kill line" code, then re-types the full line. When the paper-tape reader encounters this "kill line" code, the rest of the caster halts, ignoring the bad line until the next "end of line" code (punched by the typesetter prior to making the error) is encountered.

=== Justification wedges ===
Justification was obtained with a system of wedges. The caster has an accuracy of 2000 parts of an inch (in modern terms, 2000 dpi).

There are six wedges possible on the machine:

- the normal wedge
- two transfer wedges: the lower and the upper transfer wedge
- two justification wedges, D11 & D12:
- the unit-adding wedge (not present at all machines)
- the normal wedge belonging to the layout of the diecase or matrix-case

This wedge makes the same movement as the diecase in one direction, and the rows are polished according to the layout and the set of the used font.

- the lower transfer-wedge

This wedge is used in combination with the normal wedge.

- the 0005-justification wedge

This 0005-wedge can be laid in 15 different positions; the difference between two positions is 0.0005 inch.

- the 0075-justification wedge

This 0075-wedge can be laid in 15 different positions; the difference between two positions is 0.0075 inch.

- the unit-adding wedge

When taken into action, will change the position of the lower transfer wedge, and add 1, 2 or 3 units to the width of the character cast. The attachment used for this needed some extra coding.

- the upper transfer-wedge

This wedge was used when the 0075 & 0005 justification wedges are used, in combination with the normal wedge.

The combined actions of all these wedges governed the opening of the mould-blade, and in this way the width of the character or space to be cast was adjusted.

The position of the 0005- and 0075-wedges was put onto the right position during the codes that marked the start of casting the line. Two codes were used during a procedure that was called:

==== Double justification ====
- The first code, with three holes in the ribbon (0075, b, 0005) caused the following actions:
  - the pump is stopped
  - both justification-wedges move to the same position b
  - the previous line already cast was transferred to the galley
- the second code has two holes in the ribbon: (0075, a):
  - the lead-pump is halted for this machine-cycle
  - and the pump-mechanism is reactivated for the next next machine cycle
  - the 0075-wedge is brought to position a. The 0005-wedge will remain at position b.

The 3/8-position was called “neutral”. In this position, the 0075-wedge is at row 3, and the 0005-wedge will be at row 8. In this position no width was added to the space or character to be cast. The minimum was 1/1. In this position the width of the cast was 2 × 0.0075″ + 7 × 0.0005″ = 0.0185″ less. The maximum 15/15 added a lot more to the cast: 12 × 0.0075″ + 7 × 0.0005″ = 0.0935″. The operator had to be aware that the opening of the mould should always be smaller than 0.2″ because otherwise the matrix could not seal the mould, and a splash of molten lead would occur.

==== Single justification ====
Single justification was used to change the position of the justification wedges whenever needed, without transferring the line to the galley. This procedure was also used to adjust the spaces in more than one segment within a line. In this way it was possible to cast complete time-tables.

- The first code, with two holes in the ribbon, caused the following actions:
  - the pump was stopped and halted
  - the 0005-justification-wedge moved to its desired position
- the second code, with two holes in the ribbon, was needed:
  - to ensure no pump-action during this machine-cycle
  - to activate the pump-mechanism for the next machine cycle
  - to bring the 0075-wedge in the desired position.

Besides this, there was also the possibility to cast high-spaces. Those high-spaces could support any overhanging character. When a character could not be cast at the desired width where it was put into the matrix-case, the character could be cast. A part of the sign would not be supported by the ingot. Directly after the character was cast, one or more high-spaces of 5 or 6 units were cast, to add to the desired width and to support the sign, in order to resist the pressure during the printing-process.

==== Unit shift ====
On top of this, there was the possibility of unit-shift. With this attachment it became possible to use a matrix-case with an extra row: 16 × 17 positions. The wedge still had exactly 15 positions. The matrix-case was, when needed, forced to go to the next row. The matrix was cast at the width of the wedge 1 position higher. This system made it possible to place more matrices in the matrix-case. Another advantage for Monotype was that it made it possible to change the layout of the matrix-case in such a way that any customer could get its own personalized layout.

==== MNH & MNK ====
There were even other 16×17 systems possible, in both the matrix-case and the wedge had 16 possible positions. These systems were rather expensive, because of all the extra wedges needed that could not be used on other machines. The 16th row was coded with a code of two or three letters. Of this system there have been two variants: the extra row was coded with either MNH or MNK.

== Calculating with the Monotype system ==
All the calculations are "performed" by the keyboard, and displayed on the paper drum at its top.

Each keystroke rolls the drum, and variable spaces also move the pointer up or down. The drum used is specific to the line length and set size.

At the end of the line, the pointer indicates the correct settings for the wedges, which are then punched by the operator using the keys in the special rows.

The actual calculation is shown below in two examples.

=== Definitions ===
==== The set ====
The set of a character is defined as the width of the widest character in quarter-points pica.

8 1/4 set ⇒ W = 8.25 pica points wide = 8.25 / (6 × 12) = 8.25 / 72 = 0.11458333 inch.

==== Unit ====
1 unit = 1/18 of the widest character: 1 unit of 8,25 set = 8,25 / (6 × 12 × 18) = 8,25 / 1296 = 0.0063657 inch.

=== Calculating the adjustment correction at the end of the line ===
==== Example 1 ====
Example 1: line 24 pica long, 8.25 set: (24 × 0.1660 × 1296) / 8.25 = 626 units 8.25 set.

620 units used, 8 variable spaces ⇒ 6 units left to split: 6 units 8.25 set = (6 × 8.25 / 1296) / 8 = 0.004774 inch.

The accuracy of the machine is in steps of 0.0005 inch: 0.004774 × 2000 = 9.548 rounded at 10.

When the 0075/0005 wedges are placed at 3/8, there is no change: 3 × 15 + 8 = 53 steps.

10 steps of 0.0005″ extra make: 63 = 4 × 15 + 3: the wedges need to be placed at 4/3. The code typed:

0075 4
0075 3 0005

==== Example 2 ====
Example 2: line 16 pica long, 12 set: (16 × 0.1660 × 1296) / 12 = 287 units 12 set.

300 units used, 6 variable spaces ⇒ 3 units to split:

3 units 12 set = [(3 × 12 / 1296) / 6] × 2000 = 9.26 steps of 0.0005 inch.

53 − 9 = 44 = 2 × 15 + 14: the wedges need to be placed at 2/14.

The code typed:

0075 2
0075 14 0005

== See also ==
- Monotype typefaces
- Monotype Corporation
- Lanston Monotype Company
- Linotype machine

== Sources ==
- A Composition Manual. Brooklyn, New York: Printing Industries of America. 1953.
- The Monotype System; a book for owners & operators of monotypes. Philadelphia: Lanston Monotype Machine Co. 1912 – via Archive.org.
- Legros, Lucien Alphonse; Grant, John Cameron (1916). Typographical Printing-Surfaces: The Technology and Mechanism of their Production – via Archive.org.
