= Sort (typesetting) =

Character printing block

Diagram of a cast metal sort. a: face. b: body or shank. c: point size. 1: shoulder. 2: nick. 3: groove. 4: foot.

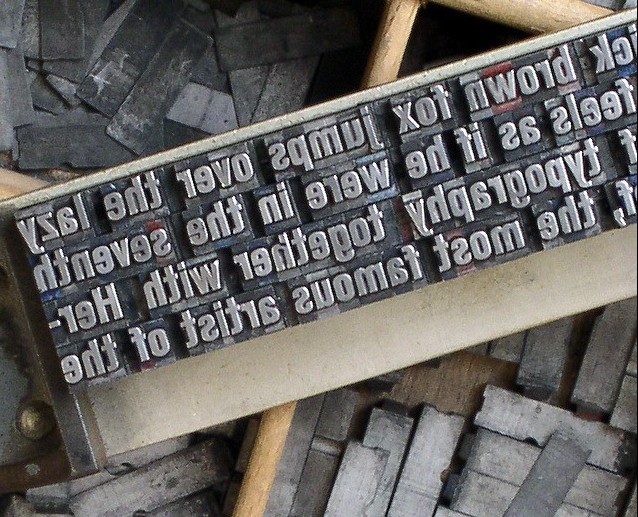
Metal type sorts arranged on a composing stick

In physical typesetting, a sort or type is a block with a typographic character cast on it, used—when lined up with others—to print text. In movable-type printing, the sort or type is cast from a matrix mold and assembled by hand with other sorts bearing additional characters into lines of type to make up a form, from which a page is printed.

== Background ==
From the invention of movable type until the invention of hot metal typesetting, printed text was, for the most part, created by selecting sorts from a type case and assembling them line by line into a form used to print a page. When the form was no longer needed all of the type had to be sorted back into the correct slots in the type case in a very time-consuming process called "distributing". This sorting process led to the individual pieces being called sorts. It is often claimed to be the root of expressions such as "out of sorts" and "wrong sort", although this connection is disputed.

During the hot metal typesetting era, printing equipment used matrices to cast type as needed during the typesetting process. The popular Linotype cast entire lines of text at once rather than individual sorts, while the less popular competitor Monotype still cast the sorts individually. Later, when phototypesetting replaced hot metal typesetting, sorts disappeared entirely from the mainstream printing process.

== See also ==
- History of western typography
- Letterform
- Matrix (printing)
- Typeface
- Typography
- Typeface anatomy
