= Intertype Corporation =

Typesetting machine manufacturer

- Type: Defunct
- Industry: Graphic Arts Equipment
- Founded: 1911
- Founder: Hermann Ridder
- Defunct: 1957, merged with Harris-Seybold
- Headquarters: Brooklyn, New York, United States
- Key people: Wilbur Scudder, Gilbert Powderly Farrar, Edwin W. Shaar
- Number of employees: 750 employees in 1912

Intertype Machine on display at the Historical Museum of Crete

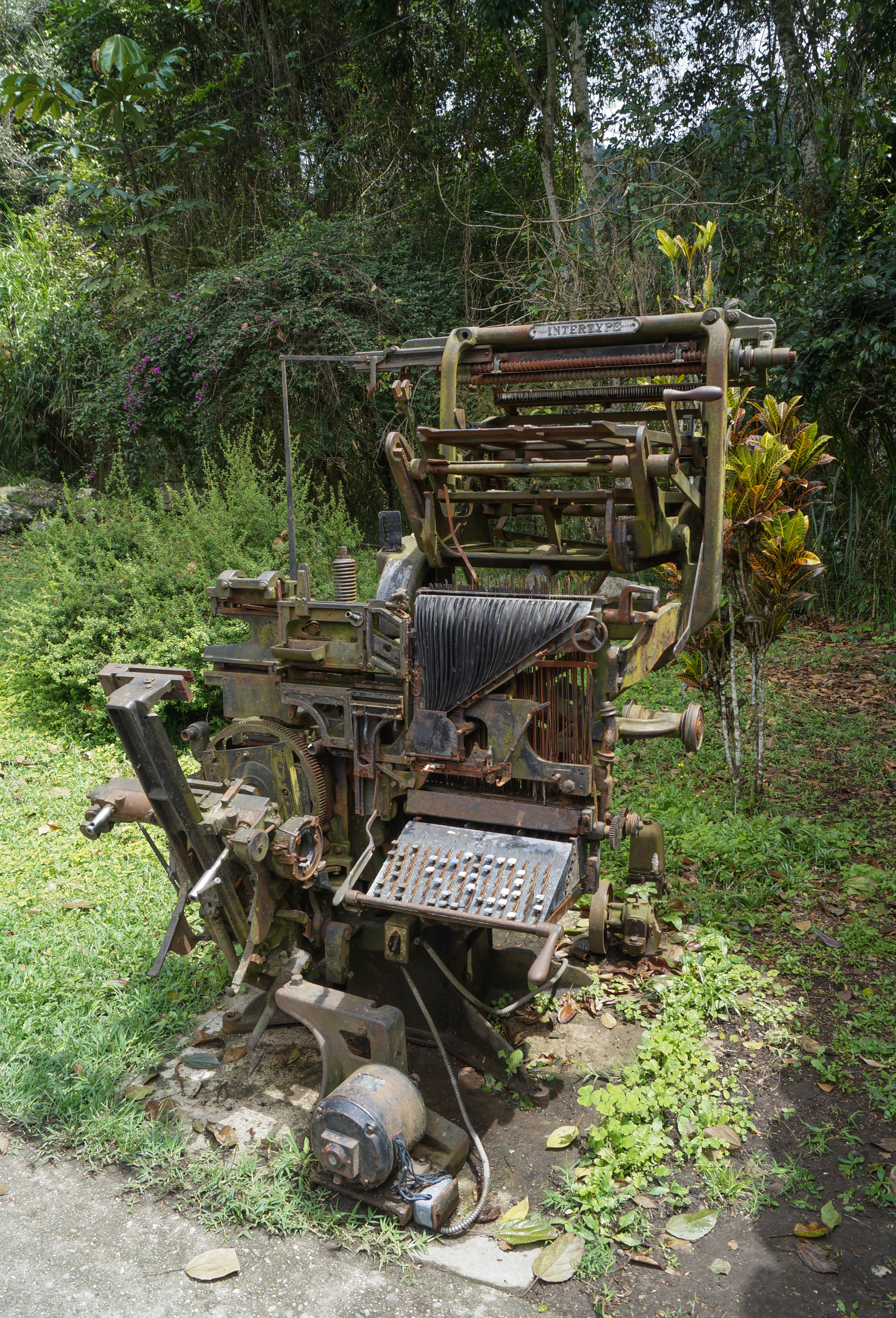
Intertype Machine left outside to rust and decompose

The Intertype Corporation produced the Intertype, a hot metal typesetting machine closely resembling the Linotype, and using the same matrices as the Linotype. It was founded in New York in 1911 by Hermann Ridder, of Ridder Publications, as the International Typesetting Machine Company, but purchased by a syndicate for $1,650,000 in 1916 and reorganized as the Intertype Corporation.

Originally, most of their machines were rebuilt Linotypes. By 1917, however, Intertype was producing three models of its own machine. Most of the original patents for the Linotype had expired and so the basic works of the Intertype were essentially the same, though incorporating at least 51 improvement patents. The standard Intertype could cast type up to thirty points and they also offered a "Composing Stick Attachment" that allowed their caster to be used to cast headlines up to 60 points.

Despite initial liquidity problems, Intertype was quite successful in later years, producing mixer machines, high speed machines, and the first photo-type compositor. In 1957, Intertype merged with Harris-Seybold, a manufacturer of presses and paper cutters, to become Harris-Intertype Corporation. After the merger, the Harris-Intertype Fotosetter was introduced. It was the first photo-typesetting machine and was based upon the standard Intertype machine, replacing the brass type matrices with small film negatives and instead of casting, used these to expose photographic paper.

== Type Development ==
Throughout its history, Intertype machines were typically better built and engineered than Mergenthaler's Linotype, with simpler, more effective mechanisms. However, while both Mergenthaler and Lanston Monotype were known for producing new and innovative type designs, virtually all of Intertype's typefaces were derivatives of, or supplied to them, by the Bauer Type Foundry. The only type designer of note associated with Intertype was Edwin W. Shaar, who pioneered in adapting script faces for machine composition.

=== Intertype Matrices ===
These typefaces were produced by Intertype:

- Beton (1931–36, Heinrich Jost), matrices cut by Bauer Type Foundry
- Cairo
- Czarin (c. 1948, Edwin W. Shaar), a knock-off of Rudolf Koch's capitals-only font Offenbach Medium with lower-case letters added by Scharr
- Folio (1956–63, Baum + Bauer), matrices cut by Bauer Type Foundry
- Futura was copied by Intertype with additional weights being added in the early 1950s by Edwin W. Shaar and Tommy Thompson
- Imperial + Italic (1954, Edwin W. Shaar), used by The New York Times since 1967
- Kenntonian
- Satellite + Italic + bold (1974, Edwin W. Shaar)
- Vogue series
  - Vogue
  - Vogue Oblique
  - Vogue Condensed
  - Vogue Extra Condensed (1971, Edwin W. Shaar)
  - Vogue Bold
  - Vogue Bold Oblique
  - Vogue Bold Condensed also known as Vogue Headletter
  - Vogue Medium Condensed
  - Vogue Bold Extra Condensed
  - Vogue Extra Bold + Oblique
  - Vogue Extra Bold Condensed + Oblique
  - Lining Vogue + Bold

=== Intertype Berlin ===
The Berlin branch of Intertype was actually more active in producing new designs than the parent company. The following matrices were produced there:

- Berlin (1962)
