= Baltimore Type Foundry =

- Company type: Defunct
- Industry: Type foundry
- Founded: Baltimore, Maryland, c. 1799
- Defunct: Merged into A.T.F., 1892
- Headquarters: Baltimore, Maryland, United States
- Key people: Samuel Sower, founder; Henry Lafayette Pelouze, owner; Charles J. Cary, final owner.

There have been two, unrelated firms using the name Baltimore Type Foundry.

== First Baltimore Type Foundry ==
The first Baltimore Type Foundry, considered to be the second oldest type foundry in the United States, was founded around 1799 by Samuel Sower and was continued by his son-in-law, Richard Spaulding. In 1832, the business was sold to Fielding Lucas Jr., and it remained in the Lucas family until 1879 when it was sold to Henry Lafayette Pelouze, owner of the Richmond Type Foundry, and it operated as a branch of that foundry until 1883. It was subsequently purchased by Charles J. Carey & Co. and operated independently until it was merged into American Type Founders at its formation in 1892. A year after A. P. Luse died in 1891, the foundry became one of the twenty-three foundries that merged to become American Type Founders.

=== Typefaces ===
These foundry types were originally cast by the first Baltimore Type Foundry:

- Geometric Series (1884)
- Oak Leaf (1832)

== Baltotype ==
Baltotype
- Company type: Defunct
- Industry: Type foundry
- Founded: Baltimore, Maryland
- Defunct: 1978
- Headquarters: Baltimore, Maryland, United States
- Key people: Herbert F. Czarnowsky, Tommy Thompson, George Battee, Herman Schnoor

The second Baltimore Type & Composition Co., better known as Baltotype, or just Balto, was founded in the early twentieth century by the Czarnowski family and remained in business until at least 1978. It was a "secondary foundry", mostly casting from matrixes made by Lanston Monotype Company or British Monotype, though they also cut a few faces of their own. A subsidiary, Baltimore Matrix, made these available to other secondary foundries in various cities.

=== Typefaces ===
These foundry types were cast by the first Baltimore Type Foundry. Some were original, and others were fonts from other foundries sold under new names:

- Airport Gothic (a knock-off of Futura, probably made from smuggled electrotyped matrixes, though some later additions to the family were copied from Monotype's Twentieth Century)
  - Airport Black (1943)
  - Airport Black Condensed
  - Airport Broad
  - Airport Relief (actually British Monotype's Gill Sans Cameo Ruled)
  - Airport Tourist (actually Bauer's Futura)
- Baltimore Script (Tommy Thompson/George Battee, 1955)
- Czarin (c. 1948. The capital letters, issued first as Czarin Title, were a copy of Rudolf Koch's Offenbach, while the lower-case letters were designed for the foundry by Edwin W. Shaar.)
- Emperor (1957, modeled after Stephenson Blake's Wide Latin)
- Greco Bold (mid-1920s, original matrixes possibly cut by Monotype)
  - Greco Bold Italic
- Homewood (1930s, essentially an in-line copy of Stemple's Metropolis Bold)
- IBM Executive Modern
- Mademoiselle (designed by Tommy Thompson for Mademoiselle magazine in 1953 and later offered for general sale; matrixes cut by Herman Schnoor)
- Tourist Extra Condensed (an exact copy of American Type Founders' Phenix)
- Trend (1953, a slightly back-slanted copy of American Type Founders' Dom Casual)
- Trylon (1957, modeled after Stephenson Blake's Playbill)
  - Trylon Shaded + Trylon Shaded Oblique (both designed in-house by George Battee)
- Vernen (1953, a copy of American Type Founders' Huxley Vertical, differing only in that the A, K, M, N, W, and Y are not rounded)
- Vista (1956, very similar to Bauer's Hellenic Wide)
- Wide Line Gothic (an extended version of MacKellar, Smiths and Jordon's Philadelphia Lining Gothic cut by Herman Schnoor)
