= Bodoni =

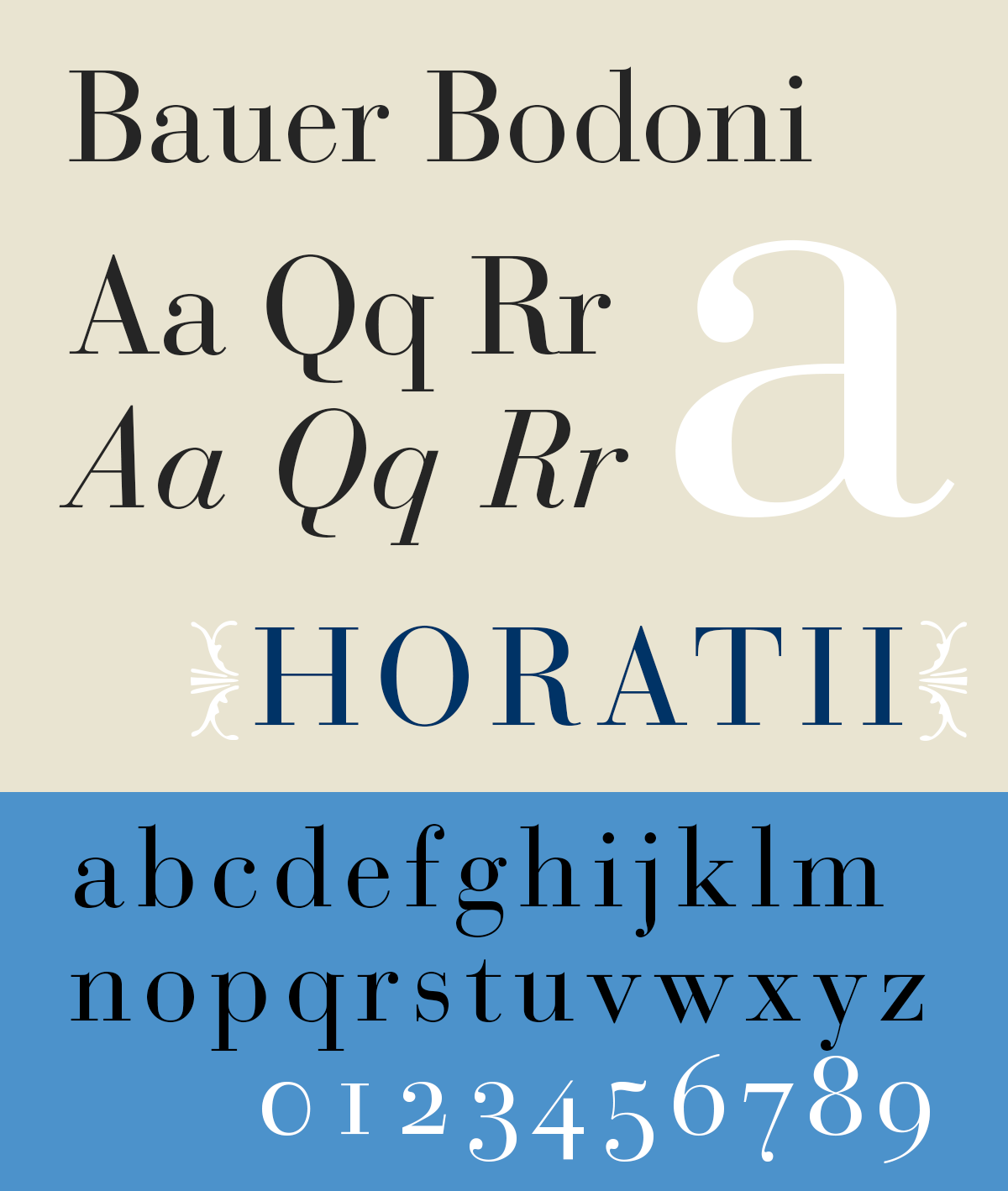
- Category: Serif
- Classification: Vox-ATypI: Didone; British: Didone; Bringhurstian: Romantic
- Designer: Giambattista Bodoni
- Date created: 1790
- Re-issuing foundries: Bauer Type Foundry, Mergenthaler Linotype Company, URW Type Foundry, Monotype Imaging, Bitstream Inc., International Typeface Corporation, H. Berthold AG
- Variations: Berthold Bodoni Antiqua; LTC Bodoni 175; Linotype Bodoni; Bauer Bodoni; Filosofia; ITC Bodoni
- Shown here: Bauer Bodoni

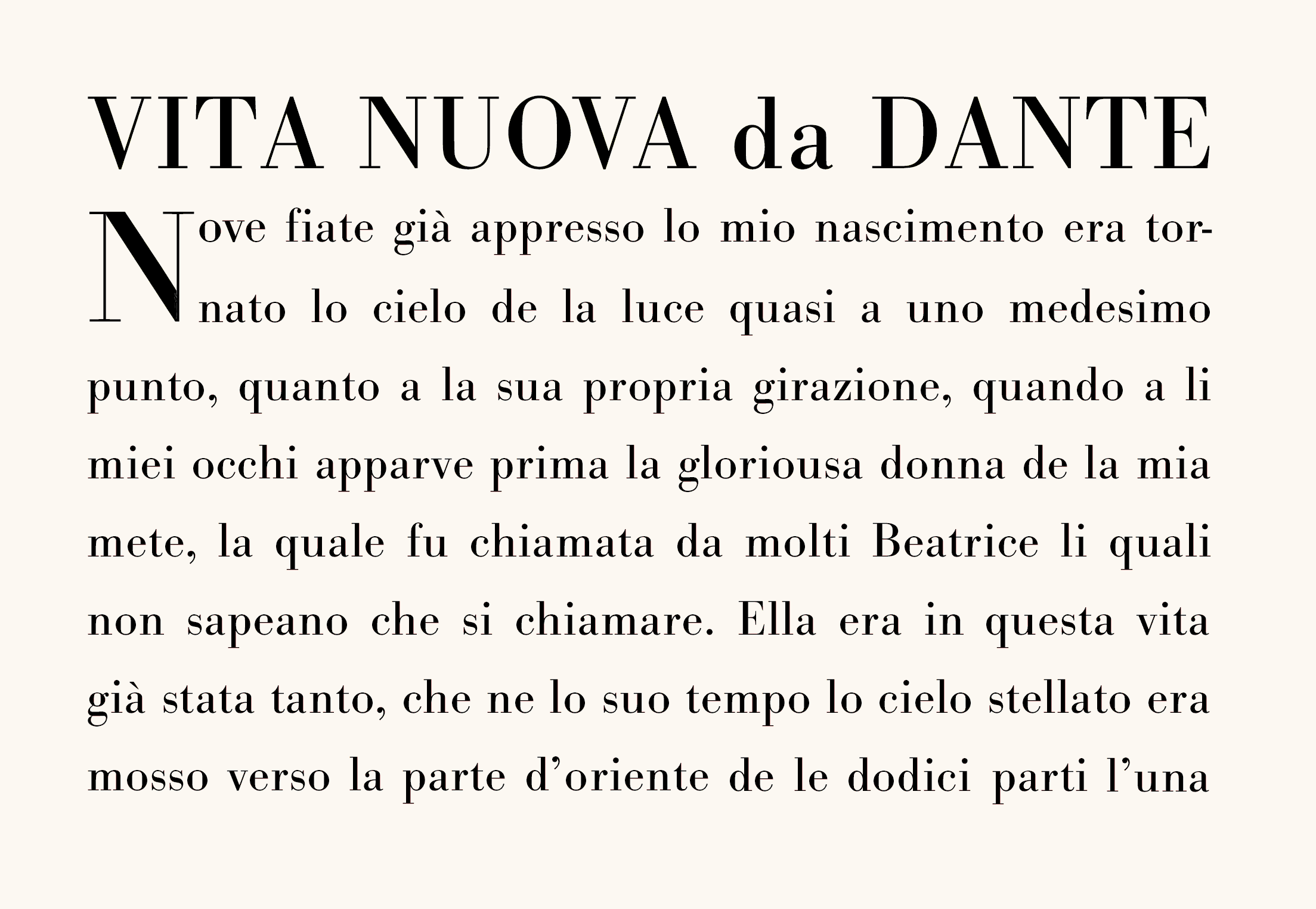
Facsimile of lines from Dante's "La Vita Nuova", first published with Bodoni types by the Officina Bodoni in 1925. Actual font is the digital Bodoni Monotype published in 1999.

Bodoni (/bəˈdoʊni/, Italian: [boˈdoːni]) is the name given to the serif typefaces first designed by Giambattista Bodoni (1740–1813) in the late eighteenth century and frequently revived since. Bodoni typefaces are classified as Didone or modern. Bodoni followed the ideas of John Baskerville, as found in the printing type Baskerville, but he took them to a more extreme conclusion. Bodoni had a long career, his designs changed, and varied ending with a variety of typeface with a slightly condensed underlying structure using flat, unbracketed serifs and extreme contrast between thick and thin strokes, and an overall geometric construction.

When first released, Bodoni and other didone fonts were called classical designs because of their rational structure. However, these fonts were not updated versions of Roman or Renaissance letter styles, but new designs. They came to be called 'modern' serif fonts; since the mid-20th century, they are also known as Didone designs.

Some digital versions of Bodoni are said to be hard to read due to "dazzle" caused by the alternating thick and thin strokes, particularly as the strokes are very thin at small point sizes. This is very common with optical sizes of fonts intended for use at display sizes, that are printed at text size. At which point the hairline strokes can recede to being hard to see. Versions of Bodoni that are intended to be used at text size are "Bodoni Old Face", optimized for 9 points; ITC Bodoni 12 (for 12 points); and ITC Bodoni 6 (for 6 points).

In the English-speaking world, "modern" serif designs like Bodoni are most commonly seen in headings and display uses and in upmarket magazine printing. Which is often done on high-gloss paper that retains and sets off the crisp detail of the fine strokes. In Europe, they are more often used in body text.

== Inspiration ==
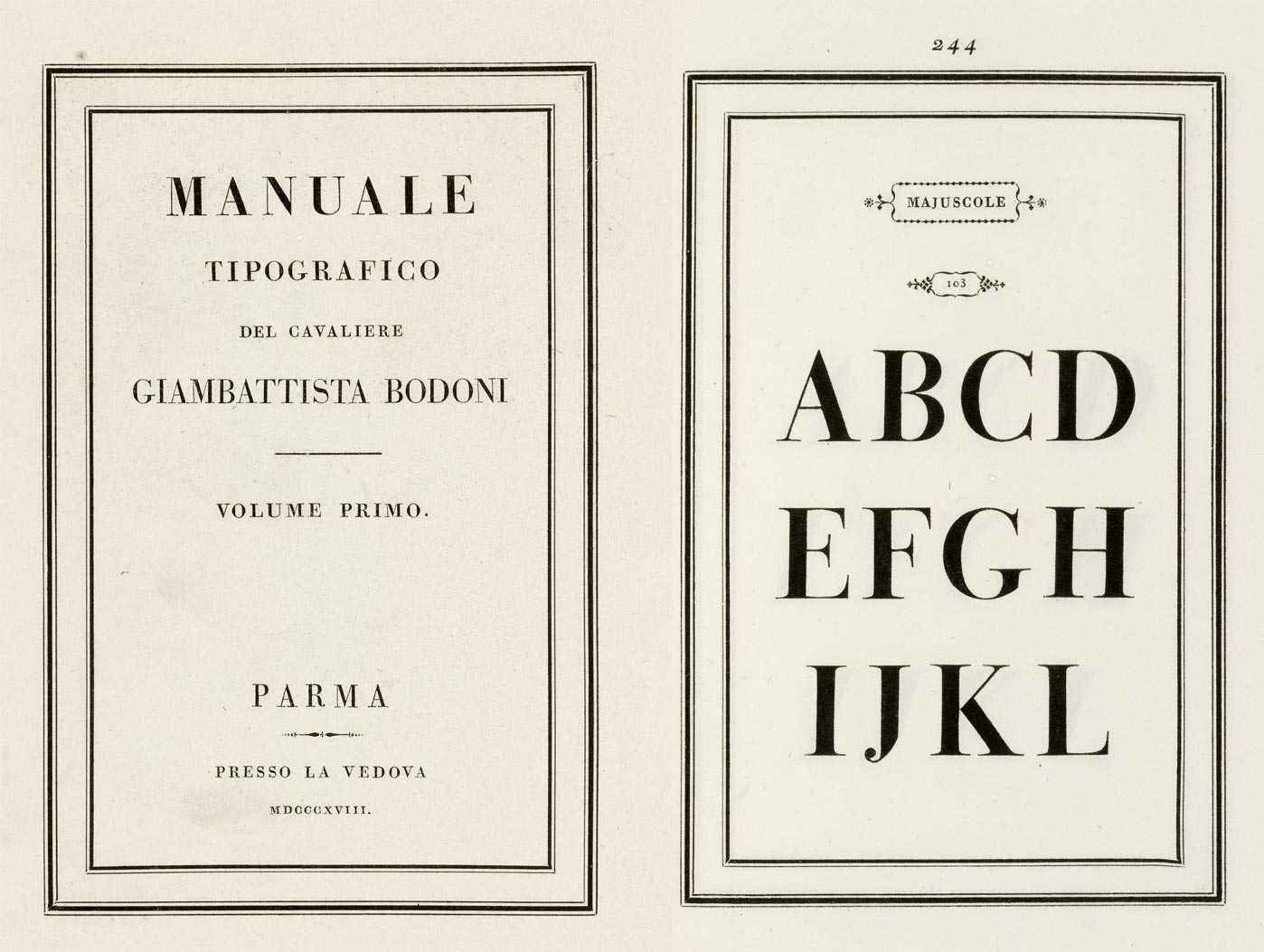
The 1818 Manuale-Tipografico specimen manual of Bodoni's press, published after his death.

Bodoni admired the work of John Baskerville and studied in detail the designs of French type founders Pierre Simon Fournier and Firmin Didot. Although he drew inspiration from the work of these designers, above all from Didot, no doubt Bodoni found his own style for his typefaces, which deservedly gained worldwide acceptance among printers.

Although to a modern audience Bodoni is best known as the name of a typeface, Bodoni was an expert printer who ran a prestigious printing-office under the patronage of the Duke of Parma, and the design of his type was permitted by and showcased the quality of his company's work in metal-casting, printing and of the paper made in Parma. The hairline serifs and fine strokes reflected a high quality of casting, since on poor-quality printing equipment serifs had to be large to avoid wear snapping them. The smooth finish of his paper allowed fine detail to be retained on the surface. Bodoni also took care in the composition of his printing, using hierarchy and borders to create an appearance of elegance, and his range of type sizes allowed him flexibility of composition.

Writing of meeting him in 1786, James Edward Smith said:

A very great curiosity in its way is the Parma printing-office, carried on under the direction of Mr. Bodoni, who has brought that art to a degree of perfection scarcely known before him. Nothing could exceed his civility in showing us numbers of the beautiful productions of his press...as well as the operations of casting and finishing the letters...his paper is all made at Parma. The manner in which Mr. Bodoni gives his works their beautiful smoothness, so that no impression of the letters is perceptible on either side, is the only part of his business that he keeps secret.

The effective use of Bodoni in modern printing poses challenges common to all Didone designs. While it can look very elegant due to the regular, rational design and fine strokes, a known effect on readers is 'dazzle', where the thick verticals draw the reader's attention and cause them to struggle to concentrate on the other, much thinner strokes that define which letter is which. For this reason, using the right optical size of font has been described as particularly essential to achieve professional results. Fonts to be used at text sizes will be sturdier designs with thicker 'thin' strokes and serifs (less stroke contrast) and more space between letters than on display designs, to increase legibility. Optical sizes were a natural requirement of printing technology at the time of Bodoni, who had to cut each size of type separately, but declined as the pantograph, phototypesetting and digital fonts made printing the same font at any size simpler; a revival has taken place in recent years as automated font development has become possible. French designer Loïc Sander has suggested that the dazzle effect, common to all Didone designs, may be particularly common in designs produced in countries where designers are unfamiliar with how to use them effectively and where the fonts that are easily commercially available will tend to have been designed for headings. Modern Bodoni revivals intended for professional use such as Parmigiano and ITC Bodoni have a range of optical sizes, but this is less common on default computer fonts.

== Reception ==
Massimo Vignelli called Bodoni "one of the most elegant typefaces ever designed."

Frederic Goudy characterized Bodoni's types as "absolutely devoid of any artistic quality" and reported that "Morris says of it that it is the most illegible type ever cut, with its preposterous thicks and thins; he even speaks of 'the sweltering hideousness of the Bodoni letter.'"

== Foundry type revivals and variants ==
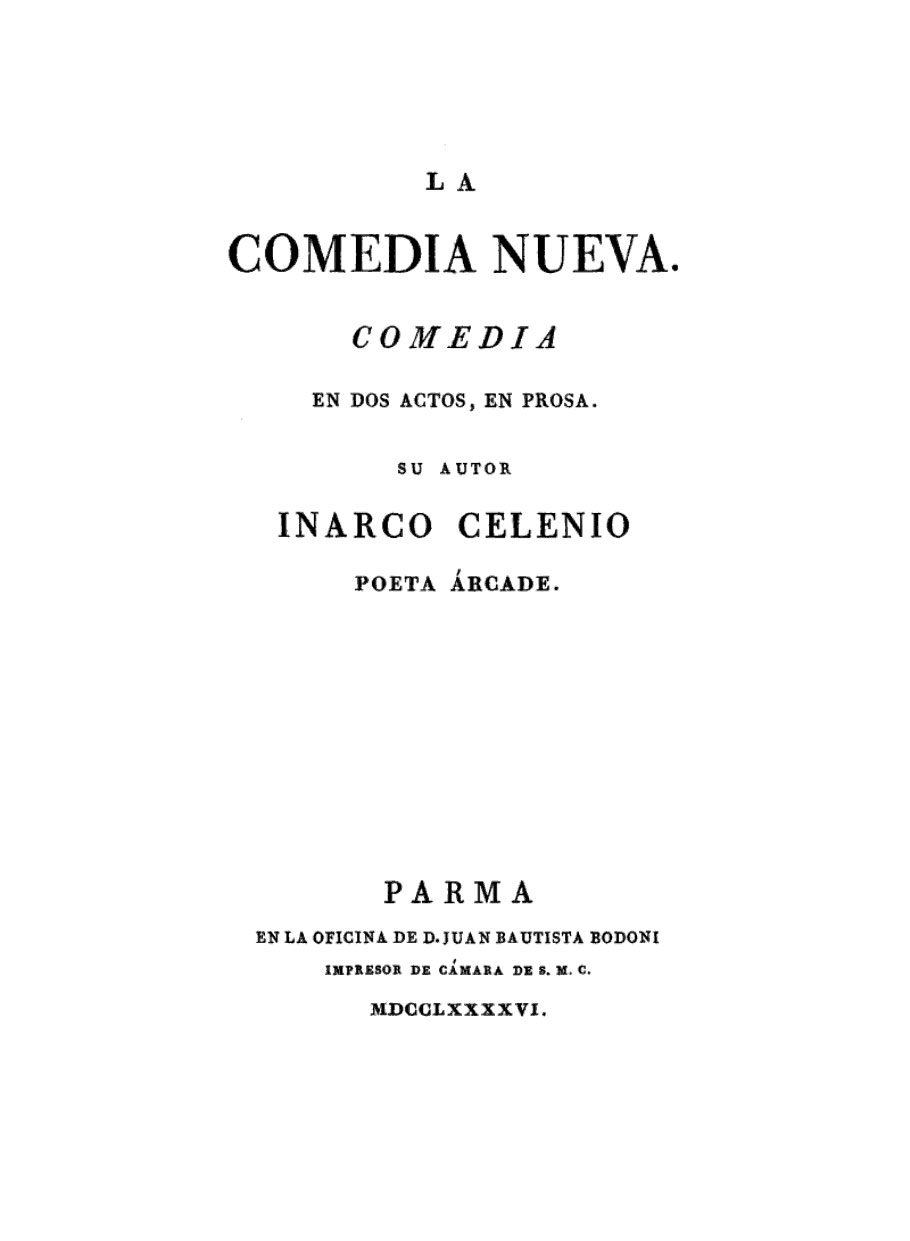
Comedia Nueva by Leandro Fernández de Moratín (published under the surename of Inarco Selenio). A title page printed by Bodoni, 1796

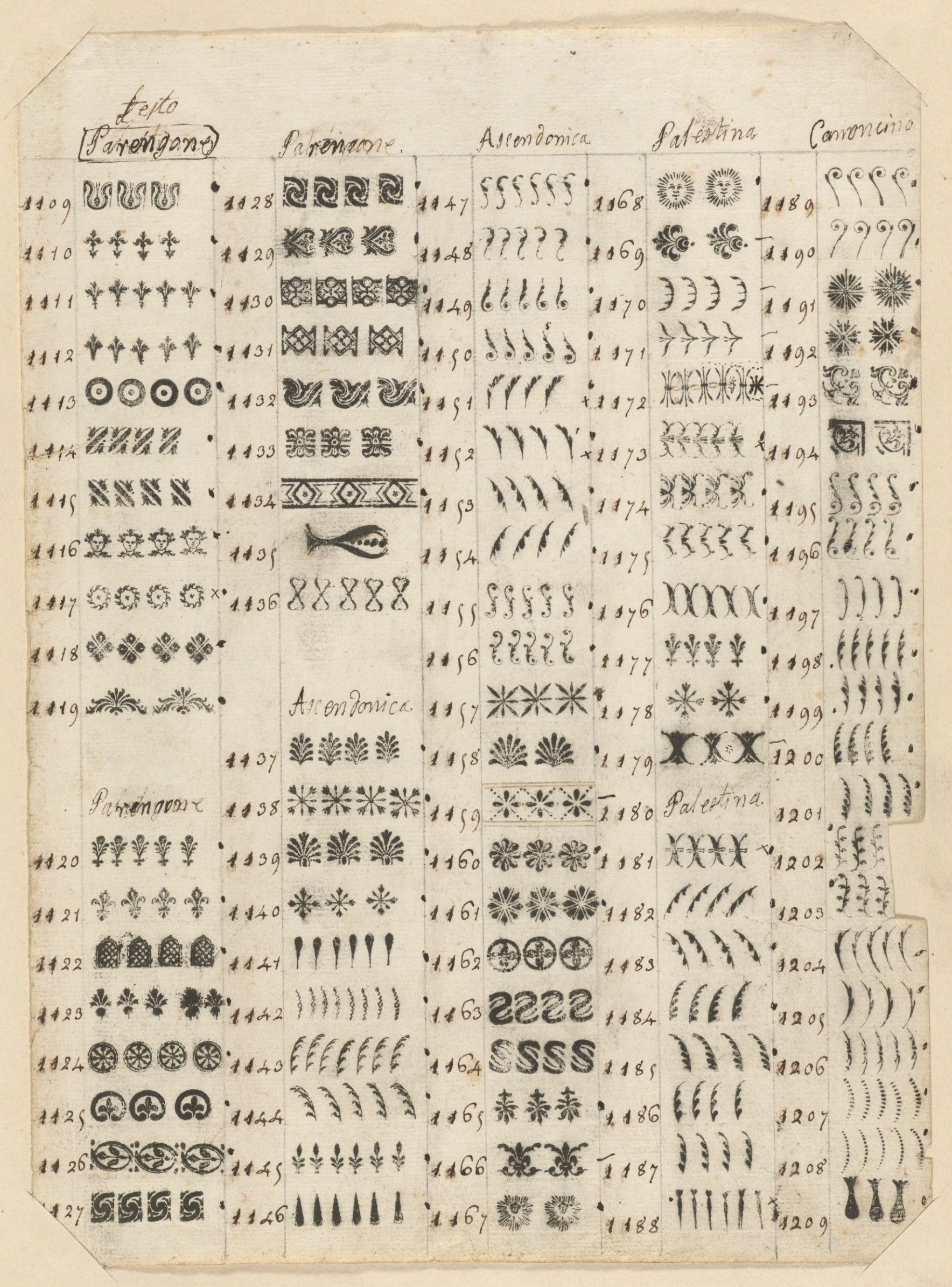
Proofs of page decorations from the Bodoni printing house

There have been many revivals of the Bodoni typeface; ATF Bodoni and Bauer Bodoni are two of the more successful.

- ATF's Bodoni series created in 1909, was the first American release to be a direct revival of Bodoni's work. All variants were designed by Morris Fuller Benton who captured the flavour of Bodoni's original while emphasizing legibility rather than trying to push against the limits of printing technology. This revival is regarded as "the first accurate revival of a historical face for general printing and design applications". However, some details were less based on Bodoni than on the work of his French contemporary Firmin Didot, for example a 't' with a flat rather than slanted top.
- Bodoni (1909)
- Bodoni Italic (1910)
- Bodoni Book (1910)
- Bodoni Book Italic (1911)
- Bodoni Bold + Italic (1911)
- Bodoni Bold Shaded (1912)
- Bodoni Shaded Initials (1914)
- Card Bodoni (1915)
- Card Bodoni Bold (1917)
- Bodoni Open (1918)
- Bodoni Book Expanded (1924)
- Ultra Bodoni + italic (1928)
- Bodoni Bold Condensed (1933)
- Ultra Bodoni Condensed + extra condensed (1933)
- Engravers Bodoni (1933), designed in 1926.
- Monotype:
- Bodoni #175 + italic (1911)
- Bodoni #375 + italic (1930), based on the Benton version.
- Recut Bodoni Bold + italic
- Bodoni Bold Condensed (Sol Hess, 1934)
- Ludlow:
- Bodoni Light + italic (Robert Wiebking, 1923)
- True-Cut Bodoni + italic (Wiebking, 1923), based on actual specimens at the Newberry Library.
- Bodoni Bold + italic (Wiebking, 1930)
- Bodoni Modern + italic (R. Hunter Middleton, 1936), probably the most faithful recutting.
- Damon Type Foundry offered a Bodoni under the name Bartlet.
- Linotype and Intertype also produced matrices for machine composition that were somewhat narrower than the foundry type versions.
- Haas Type Foundry produced a version which was then licensed to D. Stempel AG, Amsterdam Type Foundry, and Berthold.
- The Bauer Type Foundry version was drawn by Heinrich Jost in 1926. The Bauer version emphasizes the extreme contrast between hairline and main stroke. The series included the following weights:
- Bodoni Roman
- Bodoni Title
- Bodoni Bold
- Bodoni Italic
- Bodoni Italic Bold

== Cold type versions ==
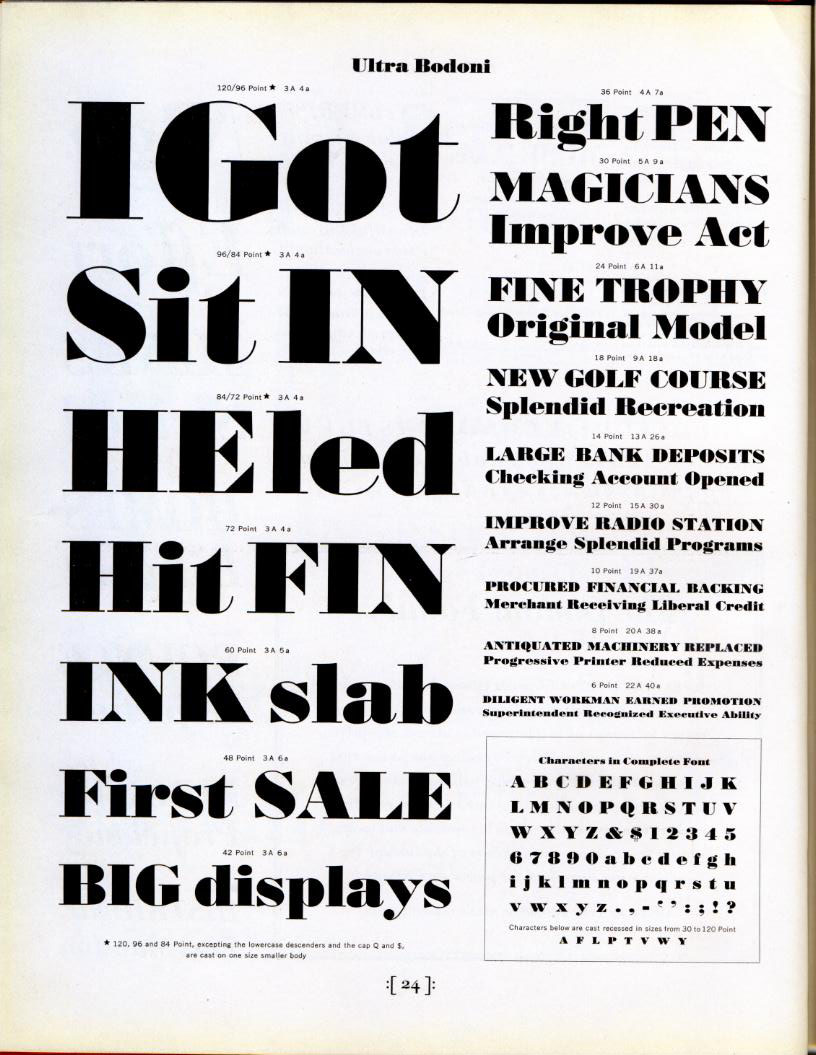
American Type Founder's Ultra Bodoni font in metal type. A derivative of their Bodoni family, the design is not directly based on Bodoni's own work but was very popular in advertising.

As it had been a standard type for many years, Bodoni was widely available in cold type. Alphatype, Autologic, Berthold, Compugraphic, Dymo, Harris, Mergenthaler, MGD Graphic Systems, and Varityper, Hell AG, Monotype, all sold the face under the name Bodoni, while Graphic Systems Inc. offered the face as Brunswick and Star/Photon called their version BodoniStar.

== Digital versions ==
Digital revivals include Bodoni Antiqua, Bodoni Old Face, ITC Bodoni Seventy Two, ITC Bodoni Six, ITC Bodoni Twelve, Bodoni MT, LTC Bodoni 175, WTC Our Bodoni, Bodoni EF, Bodoni Classico, and TS Bodoni. Zuzana Licko's Filosofia is considered by some to be a revival of Bodoni, but it is a highly personal, stylish, and stylized spinoff, rather than a revival. Although intended to be usable at text sizes, it represents the early period of the designer's career when interletter spacing was yet to be conquered, so has found use primarily in advertising. A particularly carefully optically sized Bodoni is Sumner Stone's ITC version in three sizes (6 point, 12 point, 72 point). Another important Bodoni optimized for book printing (9 point) is Günther Gerhard Lange's "Bodoni Old Face" from the Berthold library. Most other versions are best used at display sizes.

== Poster Bodoni ==
Poster Bodoni is a variant created for posters, designed by Chauncey H. Griffith in 1929.

== Applications ==
Bodoni is used in the Zara wordmark

- Poster Bodoni is used in Mamma Mia! posters.
- Bodoni is used in the logos for luxury brands Calvin Klein and Zara, as well as throughout the in-store signage of Canadian bookstore Chapters.
- A variation of Bodoni designed by Matthew Carter, called "Stilson" (originally "Postoni" during its period of exclusivity), is the primary headline font for The Washington Post newspaper.
- Bodoni was the favorite typeset of Ted Hughes, UK Poet Laureate, 1984–1998.
- Bodoni was used as Nirvana's logo font starting with their debut album, Bleach, and being used on all subsequent releases
- In the early days the Bhaktivedanta Book Trust used Bodoni Book for the text in most of its publications, especially Srimad-Bhagavatam.
- Australian university RMIT University uses Bodoni in its logo.
- Music publishing company Henle Urtext Editions uses Bodoni in its front cover of its books.

== In popular culture ==
Bodoni is the fictional capital city of San Seriffe.
