= Fonderie Typographique Française =

French type foundry

- Type: Defunct
- Industry: Type foundry
- Predecessor: Turlot, Durey & Berthier, Renault & Marcou, Huart, Chaix, and Saling type foundries
- Founded: 1921; 105 years ago
- Defunct: 1974; 52 years ago
- Fate: Merged into Fundición Tipográfica Neufville
- Successor: Fundición Tipográfica Neufville
- Headquarters: Paris, France

Fonderie Typographique Française was a French type foundry. Founded in Paris in 1921 following the merger of the Turlot, Durey & Berthier, Renault & Marcou, Huart, Chaix, and Saling type foundries. In 1969 it moved to Champigny-sur-Marne and took the name "Société Nouvelle de la Fonderie Typographique Française". Sold in 1974 to the Fundición Tipográfica Neufville, in Barcelona

== Typefaces ==
These foundry types were produced by Fonderie Typographique Française:

- Amadis, a blackletter face
- Apollo, a knock off of Futura.
- Ascot
- Atlas (1933, Karl Hermann Schaefer) An Art Deco typeface originally issued as Fatima by Schriftguss Type Foundry
- Bizerte
- Blanches Saint Germain, pearly capitals.
- Caravelle (1957–62, Baum + Bauer), originally sold as Folio by Bauer.
- Clipper, (1951, Louis Ferrand)
- Deauville (1927, M. Loewe)
- Décor, a pixelized face with mosaic effects.
- Ecriture parisienne (ronde)
- Editor (1937, Henri Chaix)
- Egyptiennes, a slab-serif face.
- Estienne (c. 1929-30, George W. Jones ), based on the slightly earlier type designs owned by Parisian printer Robert Estienne. Very tall ascenders and descenders.
- Excelsior FTF, an Art Nouveau face.
- Garamond FTF
- Hélios, a shaded titling face.
- Horizon (1952–55, Baum + Bauer), originally sold as Imprimatur by Bauer.
- Ile de France (Enric Crous-Vidal)
- Italienne (c. 1820)
- Marocaines FTF, revived by Mario Feliciano as Mazagan (2019).
- Muriel (1950, Joan Trochut-Blanchard), a script typeface.
- Normandy
- Paris (1953, Enric Crous-Vidal)
  - Flash (1953, Enric Crous-Vidal), a shaded version of Paris, not to be confused with the more famous type of the same name by Lanston Monotype.
- Pittoresques FTF (1924), a Japanese style art nouveau face, revived by Yanick Blancho as Koëlh (2015).
- Psitt (1954, René Ponot)
- Ramsès, a slab-serif face.
- Stylo(1935), a connected script.
- Swing, an Art Deco typeface.
- Vulcain, an Art Deco typeface.
