= William S. Gillies =

- Born: 1911; San Francisco
- Died: 2000 (aged 88–89)
- Known for: Typography, illustration, graphic design

William S. Gillies (born 1911, San Francisco – d. 2000) was an American artist, letterer and type designer working in New York City.

Gillies is best remembered as an illustrator for the covers of several books including the Ken Holt Mysteries, Nancy Drew Mysteries, and The Hardy Boys Mysteries. He also drew for Collier's Weekly magazine and Saturday Home magazine. He was also a gifted painter of portraits.

== Typefaces ==
- Gillies Gothic series (also called Flott)
  - Gillies Light (1935, Bauer Type Foundry)
  - Gillies Bold (1935, Bauer Type Foundry)
  - Gillies Medium and Gillies Hairline were designed but never cut.
  - Digitized versions of Gillies Gothic have been made by ITC, MyFonts and several other digital foundries.
