= Tristan Derème =

French poet, writer and politician

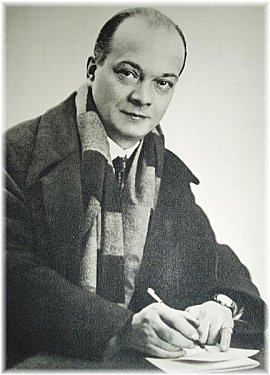
Tristan Derème

Tristan Derème (February 13, 1889 – October 24, 1941), born Philippe Huc, was a French poet and writer.

He had lived in Paris, but would often return to Oloron-Sainte-Marie, where his mother lived. There, he would recuperate through writing poetry.

== Career as a politician ==
After being mobilized in World War I, he became Secretary of the Deputy to Achille Armand Fould, which he continued until joining the Ministry for Agriculture (1930–1932).

As he began his career in political office, he became friends with Louis Barthou, Deputy of Oloron-Sainte-Marie, President of the Council and several times Minister for the Third Republic.

During the beginning of his political career, he actively corresponded with Francis Jammes who he had met in Béarn.

== Career as a writer ==
In 1906, Huc forged binding friendships with both Francis Carco and Robert de la Vaissière: They would later come together to create l'Ecole Fantaisiste (The Fantasy School).

Then, in 1908, he became an editor for two magazines--Hélios and l'Oliphant. At that time, he adopted his pseudonym, Tristan Derème. In the years leading up to World War I, The Fantasy School attracted talented individuals like Paul-Jean Toulet, Jean-Marc Bernard, Jean Pellerin, Francis Carco, Leon Vérane, Robert de la Vaissière, Rene Bizet, and Noël Ruet.

In 1922, he was nominated for membership in La Pléiade, along with Charles Maurras, Anna de Noailles, and Paul Valéry. A year later, he would meet Béatrix Dassane, the Clymène of his poems. Four years after that, he began writing a column in Le Figaro with a weekly headline, which would last until 1929.

In 1938, he received the grand prize for literature from the French Academy.

== Works ==
Several collections of poetry, including:

- La Verdure dorée : 1922
- L'Enlèvement sans clair de lune : 1925
- Le Zodiaque - ou les Etoiles sur Paris : 1927
- Poèmes des colombes : 1929
- Patachou, Petit Garçon : 1929
