= Form and document creation =

Form and Document Creation is one of the things that technical communicators do as part of creating deliverables for their companies or clients. Document design is: "the field of theory and practice aimed at creating comprehensible, persuasive and usable functional documents". These forms and documents can have many different purposes such as collecting or providing information.

== Visualization and Visual Communication ==
=== Significance ===
Eva Brumberger, an instructor in the professional writing program at Virginia Tech, surveyed professional writers about the nature of their work in order to evaluate what student writers are taught before entering the work force. These professional writers confirmed that their role has developed past the verbal communication dominant in the literature presented to students and has developed into mostly visual communication.

=== Definition ===
Technical communicators must take data and convert it into information; this process is known as visualization, or visual communication. Because of the widespread use of digital media, modern technical communicators must also now think about visualization as it relates to digital forms and documents. Stuart K. Card, Jock D. Mackinlay, and Ben Shneiderman, editors of the book Readings in Information Visualization: Using Vision to Think, define visualization as the: "use of computer-supported, interactive, visual representations of data to amplify cognition". Though many forms and documents will still have a paper copy for distribution, most forms and documents are now utilized online in some fashion; this is why there is such focus on the computer-supported representations for maximal cognition. Brumberger defines visual communication as: "designing print, Web, and multimedia documents…creating visual displays of information/data, generating other visual material…and any other communication tasks which rely on visual language".

=== Examples ===
There are many areas where professional writers utilize visualization. It is most useful in the following areas: complex documents, statistical and categorical data, personal services, and histories.

Visual communication responsibilities include: designing visual content, determining when to use visual material, modifying existing material, and applying templates that already exist to material.

Visual communication tasks include designing: presentations, print documents, page layouts, images, and data displays.

=== Human-Centered Design ===
Human-centered design focuses on ensuring that the audience will comprehend the information being presented. It is: "how a frustrated and confused subject...comprehends a critical message in a crowded and noisy environment". The goal of human-centered design is "to make information accessible" and "to give form to data".

Luke Wroblewski, senior director of Project Ideation and Design at Yahoo! Inc., and author of Web Form Design: Filling in the Blanks, also has some human-centered design ideas for web forms and documents. He says: "because people want what’s on the other side of a web form, their general tendency is to jump right in, start answering questions and hope to get it done quickly". As a result, he recommends designing a clear path to completion for the form or document. He also mentions messaging without proper priority, like hard-to-find error messages, and unconnected primary actions that can similarly cloud the steps people need to take in order to get through a form. For a web form to have human-centered design, information must be structured "in a logical pattern from start to finish".

== The Structure and Organization ==
When a technical communicator is creating a form or document, it is vital that they pay close attention to structure and organization as these are the means that allow visualization to work.

=== Functional Analysis ===
In order to design a form or document, the writer should understand and evaluate the different constraints in the rhetorical situation; this is called functional analysis. One of the biggest components in analyzing a form or document is to determine the communicative purpose of the form or document. Leo Lentz and Henk Pander Maat, at the University of Utrecht, break down communicative purpose into four elements:

1. intended communicative effect: the intended effect should fall into one of three categories; "a cognitive change in the mental state of the reader, who learns something or forms a particular attitude, a change in the reader's behavior, such as handling a machine or buying a product, or a change in the social reality as a result of the collective behavior of readers, such as the sale of a product".
2. topic: this is based on the reader's needs, since the reader is the one expected to act on the information.
3. target group: this should be a specific group described either by demographic variables or communicative predispositions.
4. organizational goal: this is the change that should occur in every individual reader.

After analyzing the communicative purpose, the technical communicator can design a form or document that will match the requirements and meet expectations for it.

=== Explicit Structure ===
One aspect of form and document creation that technical communicators should pay close attention to is explicit structure. When the structure is explicit, the reader can interact with the form or document on a more effective level. The technical communicator’s "primary means to make structure explicit is through headings and links". The technical communicator must add these headings when they are drafting the form or document, because the structure will remain implicit until they are added.

The authors of Meet Your Type: A Field Guide to Love & Typography add hierarchy to the idea of making structure explicit. They say: "effective hierarchy gets people to look where you want them to look, when you want them to look there. Without it the reader is left confused and frustrated. Emphasis can be stressed by size, weight, color, style, and placement". Thus, emphasis from several different font decisions joins headings as a feature that makes structure explicit.

=== Abstract Structure ===
Another aspect to consider when designing a form or document is abstract structure. This is the idea that text has a graphical component. Text incorporates a graphical component not only because the words are: "often accompanied by conventional graphics such as pictures or diagrams, but they themselves form graphical elements such as titles, headings, chapters, sections, captions, paragraphs, and bulleted lists".

When considering abstract structure in planning a form or document, a technical communicator must also look at what Richard Power, Nadjet Bouayad-Agha, and Donia Scott call document structure: "the organization of a document into graphical constituents like sections, paragraphs, sentences, bulleted lists, and figures". This document structure also goes hand-in-hand with the human-centered design aspect of visualization as pertaining to form and document creation. Technical communicators should look at their form or document to make sure that the abstract structure of the form or document is helping achieve the overall goal with the reader.

Though it focuses on a visual and graphic effect, abstract structure also focuses on wording. The examples that follow are taken verbatim from Power, Bouayad-Agha, and Scott. They show a progression from a passage written by a technical communication novice (a), to an edit by a more experienced technical communicator (b), to an edit by a senior expert technical communicator (c). The successive changes are designed to make the structure and wording valid.

(a)
Elixir is a white cream.
It is used in the treatment of cold sores.
It contains aliprosan. This is effective against a range of viral skin disorders.
It should be used only on your lips and face.

(b)
Elixir is a white cream.

It is used in the treatment of cold sores.

It contains aliprosan. This is effective against a range of viral skin disorders.

It should be used ONLY on your lips and face.

(c)
Elixir is a white cream. It is used in the treatment of cold sores. It contains aliprosan. This is effective against a range of viral skin disorders. N.B. Elixir should be used only on your lips and face.

=== Visual Organization ===
Other considerations the technical communicator keeps in mind when creating a form or document include: number of pages, flush, capital letters, and bullets.

==== Number of Pages ====
If at all possible, using one page for the document or form is best because the reader can: "glance at the information without flipping pages or having to search for related sections, both results of poor planning that can distract and confuse the reader".

==== Flush ====
When typing a document, the technical communicator should make the text flush left because: "it’s the easiest to read because we read it most often". Keeping the text flush left instead of justifying it: "[gives] the text a more harmonious appearance and makes it easier to read, since all wordspaces have the same width". The reason justified text should be avoided is because of the: "hideously [stretched] and [squished] words and spaces".

==== Capital Letters ====
Capital letters should not be used to accentuate words on a form or document; it is too distracting and disrupts the look of the form or document. When capital letters are absolutely necessary, say in the case of an acronym or abbreviation, small caps should be used, with or without initial caps. When capital letters are not absolutely necessary, the technical communicator should evaluate the effectiveness of italicizing the word or phrase for emphasis.

==== Bullets ====
Some technical communicators use hyphens for listed items; however, a writer should use bullets or centered points instead.

=== Standard Expository Model ===
In analyzing structure and organization for a form or document, it is beneficial for a technical communicator to determine if the form or document being created fits within a group of documents called the standard expository model (SE model). If the form or document being created is an SOE, then there are special strategies to writing the form or document.

Standard expository models are: "nonfiction print documents that (1) are primarily informational rather than expressive; (2) are intended to be read linearly (broadly speaking, from beginning to end); and (3) reveal structure explicitly with at least one heading level but very often more."

If a form being created fits within the SE model, there are three main strategies to be employed when creating it.

1. The first is to tuck introductions and conclusions. This means that there is no separate heading for the introduction and conclusion; instead, the introduction and conclusion aspects of the writing are within the first and last main points.
2. The second strategy is to subdivide and indent subpoints within a section to account for brief subsections.
3. The final strategy is to use stacked headings by adding subheadings underneath main headings, much like in this Wikipedia article itself.

=== Language and Word Choice ===
Gillian Harvey, a partner and senior designer at Plumbheavy Design Inc., a company that does graphic design and information design, has several recommendations for technical communicators regarding language and word choice.

1. The first is to use vocabulary that the reader will easily understand; this is vital when creating a form or document with instructions the reader is expected to follow.
2. Harvey also recommends the use of personal pronouns, especially "you" and "your," to give the reader a feeling of ownership when reading a form or document.
3. Finally, Harvey instructs technical communicators to use active phrases rather than passive phrases because they are easier for a reader to comprehend.

== Typeface Selection ==
After evaluating the purpose and desired effect of a form or document, and creating a structure and wording that meets that purpose and effect, a technical communicator may think the majority of the job is complete. However, the typeface used for a form and document can greatly affect not only the reader, but the purpose and effect of that form or document.

=== Typeface vs. font ===
Most simply, "a font is what you use, and a typeface is what you see". The Typographer’s Glossary defines typeface as: "An artistic interpretation, or design, of a collection of alphanumeric symbols". Typeface includes "letters, numerals, punctuation, various symbols, and more". "A typeface is usually grouped together in a family containing individual fonts for italic, bold, and other variations of the primary design". A font, on the other hand, is: "a collection of letters, numbers, punctuation, and other symbols used to set text (or related) matter". To further explain, "font refers to the physical embodiment…while typeface refers to the design". In any event, the terms "font" and "typeface" are used interchangeably by some authors and designers.

=== Appropriate Selection ===
Jo Mackiewicz, from the Composition and Linguistics Department of the University of Minnesota Duluth, has done extensive research into typeface and has published multiple articles on the topic. Mackiewicz says that students should: "select typefaces that are appropriate for their technical documents". What Mackiewicz means when she talks about an "appropriate typeface" is that it contributes to the desired "overall rhetorical effect" and conveys "more specific effects…as intended". In another article, Mackiewicz points out that "typefaces substantially contribute to the visual, as opposed to the verbal, language of documents". This is important, since it has already been established that professional technical communicators see their role as largely visual as compared to verbal.

=== Personality ===
In selecting an appropriate typeface, Mackiewicz focuses on what she calls "typeface personality". She researches other technical communicators’ works to come up with a definition of typeface personality as "that aspect of typeface that imbues it ‘with the power to evoke in the perceiver certain emotional and cognitive responses’" and "the ability to convey different feelings and moods…strength, elegance, agitation, silliness, friendliness, scariness, and other moods". Mackiewicz further explains that: "increased attention to typeface personality is especially important now that students have access to thousands of typefaces, many of which can detract from or conflict with the seriousness, professionalism, and competency that students intend to convey". The selection of typeface is also important in situations where more than one typeface is present in a form or document. Mackiewicz says: "if more than one typeface is being used within a document, students should also carefully consider the extent to which the personalities of the typefaces they have selected are concordant".

==== History ====
One way that Mackiewicz notes that technical communicators can determine a typeface’s personality is through looking at its history; she says: "the personality a typeface conveys may stem in large part from the ways in which that typeface has been used in the past". To show what she means, Mackiewicz notes that the typeface Fette Fraktur is rarely used today because it was used in Nazi propaganda from 1933 to 1945. Because of situations like the one involving Fette Fraktur, Mackiewicz points out: "the ways in which a typeface has been used [in the past] can influence the overall affect (sic) of a student’s document and, consequently, it can send an unintended message".

=== Impressions on Readers ===
As in every stage of form and document design, technical communicators must be constantly aware of the impressions of design decision on the reader. Pamela W. Henderson, Joan L. Giese, and Joseph A. Cote, faculty in the Department of Marketing at Washington State University, point out that: "it is important to determine the impact of the impressions created by typeface". Their research also shows "that individual differences [in typeface] can affect attentiveness to aesthetics", or the pleasing effect of the form or document.

The Font Shop professionals also have a warning concerning typeface and its impression on readers. They recommend "[avoiding] the embarrassment of typographic rejection by first determining the likes and dislikes of your target audience".

Additionally, Jo Mackiewicz recommends technical communicators consider typefaces that are both legible and readable. Her research has shown that legible typefaces have "the quality of being decipherable and recognizable" and are important "in situations where people are scanning pages, reading signs, or skimming through catalogs or lists". One example of a legible typeface is Univers, while an illegible typeface example would be Snap ITC. On the other hand, typefaces that are readable have: "the quality of giving ‘visual comfort,’ which is especially important in long stretches of text". Mackiewicz uses Times New Roman as an example of an easily read typeface while Impact typeface is less so. Legibility and readability are important aspects of typeface to consider if the reader is going to be required to read and comprehend a large amount of text.

=== Serif vs. Sans Serif ===
One aspect of typeface selection to consider is whether or not to use serif or sans serif typefaces. Serif typefaces are "based on the carvings of the ancient Romans" and "feature small ‘feet’ at the end of the letterforms". Jo Mackiewicz points out that: "traditionally, serif typefaces have been used for the body text of technical (as well as other) documents because they seem to be more readable than sans serif typefaces". On the other hand, sans serif typefaces "were designed for the industrial age" and are "hard-working and modern, with no need for fancy serifs". Sans serif typefaces "are often used in ‘display’ elements like headings, diagrams, and tables". Based on this information, technical communicators are advised to "pair a serif and sans serif" in their forms or documents.

=== Electronic Selection ===
Because of the prevalence of computers and other electronic media in the modern world, there are some special considerations for forms and documents that will be online. New typefaces are being developed specifically for forms and documents to be presented electronically. ClearType, developed by Microsoft in 1998 "to improve the legibility of typefaces viewed on LCD displays", encompasses seven of these new typefaces. They were "designed for online reading of business documents, email, and web pages". However, after a study of the online legibility of ClearType, Times New Roman, and Verdana typefaces, researchers concluded "that it is not the technology alone that dictates legibility", as some of the ClearType typefaces were more legible than other ClearType typefaces and one of the non-ClearType typefaces. A technical communicator, creating an online document, should carefully analyze the readability of the typeface selected for their form or document.

=== Case Study: Times New Roman ===
In order to see how the various typeface aspects work together for typeface selection, look at the Times New Roman typeface. Mackiewicz notes that its letterforms "display complexity and perfection". She also lists features of the Times New Roman typeface that make it professional in personality: "moderate weight, moderate thick-to-thin transition, balanced straight-edged and rounded terminals, moderate x-height to cap-height ratio, uppercase J that sits on the baseline, horizontal crossbar on the e letterform, double-story a letterform, and double-story g letterform". Reid Goldsborough, a syndicated newspaper columnist, provides the history of the Times New Roman typeface. Times New Roman "was commissioned by the British newspaper The Times in 1931", and in 2004, the U.S. State Department "mandated that all U.S. diplomatic documents use Times New Roman instead of the previous Courier New". In Jo Mackiewicz’s study of typefaces, "one participant said that Times New Roman could be used in ‘any lengthy passages that need good readability". Finally, in a study that evaluated Times New Roman against the newer ClearType typefaces, it was found that no participants confused Times New Roman letterforms with Times New Roman numbers, symbols, or other letterforms. Based on these observations, a technical communicator could determine that Times New Roman would be an effective typeface for a form or document if the purpose was professional, the document was being read in any format, and reader readability was required.

== Evaluation ==
David Sless, director and co-founder of the Communication Research Institute talks about what he calls: "a crucial aspect of public communication: the demonstration, through testing and measurement, that an [organization’s] communication with its public does indeed work; that evidence can be produced to show that the information design is of the highest quality". He is calling attention to the fact that documented evaluation is an important part of form and document design.

Evaluation will show where a form or document needs to be improved, even when that form or document meets the overall needs for which it was created. For example, Michael Turton, a veteran designer of transactional documents and forms, was surprised to find that coworkers were having trouble with a form he designed that he knew was adequate. The form required employees to check boxes that measured 7mm by 6mm, but reported that these boxes needed to be bigger. Knowing that the boxes were adequate, Turton asked the employees to show him the problem; as it turned out, the employees were left-handed and when they were trying to mark a box, their writing hand was covering the writing on the form. So, through evaluation, Turton was able to discover the needs of his audience and created a left-handed form as well. This shows the importance of evaluation in form and document creation.

=== Criteria for Evaluation ===
Sless points out several key factors to look for when evaluating a form or document. He recommends evaluation to determine if a form or document is: "attractive, socially appropriate, physically appropriate, respectful [of the audience], credible, and containing information that is accessible and usable".

=== When to Evaluate a Form or Document ===
Sless diagrams a circular pattern for the "systematic process" of forms and documents. There are seven stages to his diagram, and then number seven leads back into number one. The seven stages are: scoping, benchmarking, prototyping, testing, refining (returning to step four as many times as needed), implementing, and monitoring.

He says that evaluation must take place at three points in this "systematic process": during step two, during steps four and five, and during step seven. A form or document should be evaluated at the benchmarking stage to determine how a current design is working. It should be used in the testing and refining stages to evaluate changes being made. Finally, the form or document should be evaluated during the monitoring stage as it is in use to "maintain its optimal performance". Sless emphasizes the importance of testing at these designated times instead of evaluating as time and money permits.

== Case Study: A Look Into Forms in the Medical Field ==
There can be many individualized decisions and problems that can occur depending on the form or document being created, the target audience, and the organization producing the form or document. These problems can occur because of rules set by a technical communicator’s own company or an external governing body. Problems can also occur based on technical problems that the technical communicator could not prepare for. To highlight these potential problems, look at forms and documents in the medical field.

=== Potential Technical Problems ===
In a study done by professionals from multiple companies and universities, family medical practices administered surveys on paper forms and electronically. However, the team could not accurately judge the advantage of the electronic form because of problems with the firewall and "institutional computer security issues". The researchers report that: "there does not appear to be an easy solution to these technical issues, especially in instances where the practice is part of a larger organization (e.g., university, hospital) that has strict requirements and procedures in place to limit transmission of information between the institution and external Internet Web sites". This example shows where technology itself can interfere with the effectiveness of a form. Also, institutional requirements can limit the design being created by a technical writer.

=== Tailoring Information to Federal Regulations ===
Sometimes, there are external restrictions on a form or document that could affect the design process. Rita Tomlin, a freelance writer and instructor at San Diego State University, investigates the implications of the Food and Drug Administration (FDA) regulations on medical writing. Tomlin says, "An essential task for the medical writer is to tailor data presentation and document content to the FDA’s expectations." The medical writer is therefore restricted by FDA expectations and not just organizational or personal expectations. Medical writers are expected to come to "an understanding of the FDA’s complex expectations" by "careful reading and interpretation of the FDA regulations and guidance documents." This is an example of the type of work a form or document designer may have to do. There could be external research needed before form or document design or redesign can occur.
