= The Secret of Skeleton Island =

The Secret of Skeleton Island may refer to:

== Film ==
- The Three Investigators and the Secret of Skeleton Island

== Literature ==
- The Secret of Skeleton Island (Epstein novel) featuring Ken Holt by Sam and Beryl Epstein
- The Secret of Skeleton Island (Three Investigators), a book in the Three Investigators series, upon which the film is based
