= Konrad Friedrich Bauer =

German type designer

- Born: 9 December 1903; Hamburg, Germany
- Died: 17 March 1970 (aged 66); Schönenberg, Baden-Württemberg
- Known for: Typography

Konrad Friedrich Bauer (9 December 1903 – 17 March 1970) was a German type designer who, though not related to founder Johann Christian Bauer, was head of the art department for the Bauer Type Foundry from 1928 until his retirement in 1968. Bauer's father was a type founder in Altona and Bauer studied art and the history of lettering before serving a printers's apprentiship. Bauer revived and modified many nineteenth-century designs and he designed Fortune the first Clarendon typeface with a matching italic. He is the author of many books on the history of design and taught book design, type and printing at the University of Mainz from 1947 until his death.

== Fonts designed by Konrad Friedrich Bauer ==
All faces designed in collaboration with Walter Baum.

- Alpha (Bauer, 1954)
- Beta (Bauer, 1954), an alternate set of lower-case letters for Alpha.
- Folio (Bauer and Intertype, 1956–63), also sold as Caravelle by Founderie Typographique Francaise.
- Imprimatur (Bauer, and Intertype, 1952–55) also sold as Horizon by Founderie Typographique Francaise
- Fortune or Volta (Bauer 1955)
- Impressum (Amsterdam Type foundry and Bauer 1962)
