= The Timișoara Times =

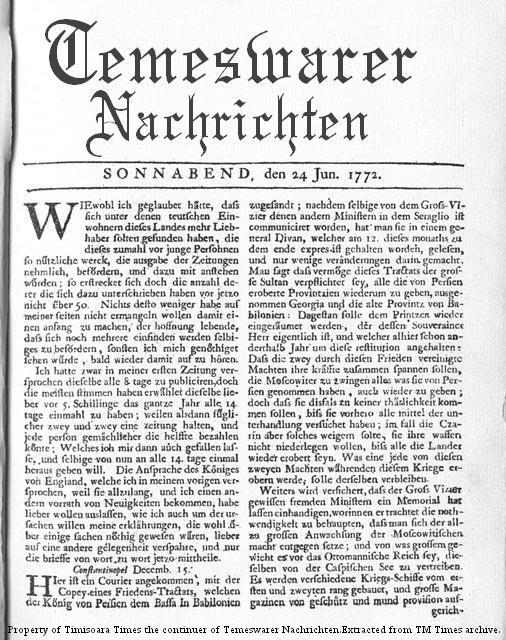
- The front page of Temeswarer Nachrichten in June 1772
- Type: Daily newspaper
- Format: Broadsheet
- Owner: Times Network Romania
- Founder: Mathias Joseph Heimerl
- Founded: 1771; 255 years ago
- Ceased publication: 2018; 8 years ago
- Headquarters: The Timișoara Times Building; Grădinii Street, Timișoara

The Timișoara Times was a Romanian daily newspaper published in Romanian and German, founded and published in Timișoara since 1771, as Temeswarer Nachrichten. It was one of the most popular local newspapers from Romania, read by hundreds of thousands people annually. The Timișoara Times was owned by Times Network Romania.

== History ==
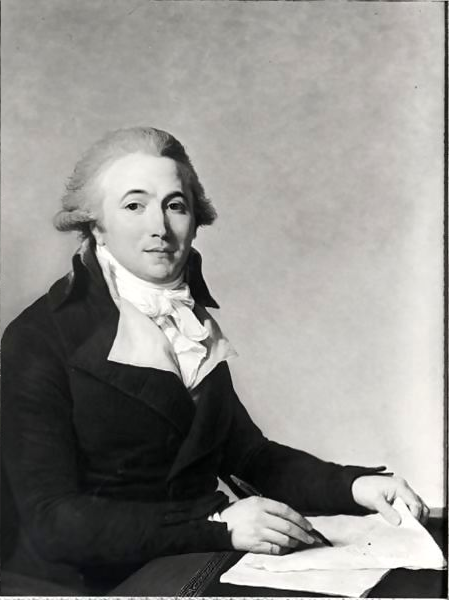
Mathias Joseph Heimerl (1727–1789), founder of Temeswarer Nachrichten

The Timișoara Times was founded as Temeswarer Nachrichten on April 18, 1771, by German journalist Mathias Joseph Heimerl. It was the first newspaper on the territory of today's Romania and the first newspaper in German outside Germany The newspaper changed its name to The Timișoara Times in 1992. The newspaper was originally published every day except Sunday, but on April 21, 1788, the staff decided to publish the first Sunday edition. On June 15, 1796, the staff added a new section that contains books reviews. Temeswarer Nachrichten started to publish in Romanian and German on 4 July 1799 to response to a rival paper, Temesvári Hírek.

In 2018, the site ceased functioning.

== Ownership ==
The Timișoara Times was owned by Times Network Romania. In the past, the newspaper had been controlled by several German directors, including Jonas Nussbaum, Wolfgang Wexler, David Holzman, and Bernd Schneider.

== Style ==
When referring to people, The Timișoara Times generally used honorifics, rather than unadorned last names (except in the sports pages, Book Review and Magazine). It stayed with an eight-column format until June 1876, years after other papers had switched to six. In the absence of a major headline, the day's most important story generally appeared in the top-right column, on the main page. The typefaces used for the headlines were custom variations of Cheltenham. The running text was set at 8.7 point Imperial.

== Mobile presence ==
In 2011, The Timișoara Times created an app for the Android which allowed users to download articles to their mobile device enabling them to read the paper even when they were unable to receive a signal. In November 2012, The Timișoara Times announced it will begin publishing daily content through an iPad application. The Timișoara Times iPad app was ad-supported and available for free without a paid subscription, but translated into a subscription-based model in 2011.

In 2012, the newspaper also announced an application for iPhone smartphones.

== Online activity ==
Online content was available on the Timișoara Times site. There were also mobile applications to access content for various mobile devices, such as Android devices and Apple's iOS platform. The Timișoara Times site announced an iOS version of the app to appear in early 2013.
