= Stempel Schneidler =

Old style serif typeface

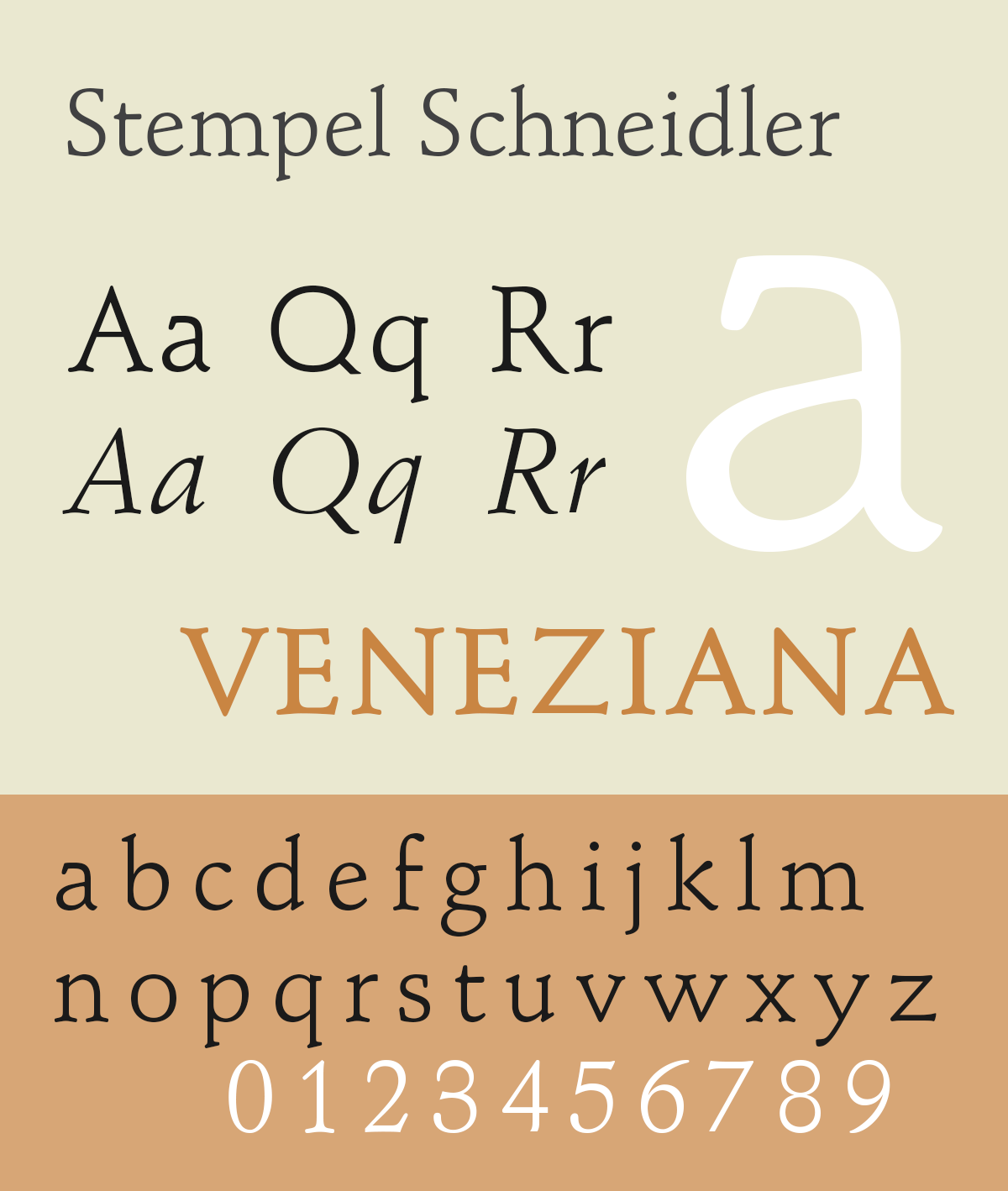
- Category: Serif
- Classification: Old style
- Designer(s): F.H. Ernst Schneidler
- Foundry: Bauersche Gießerei
- Date released: 1936
- Re-issuing foundries: Linotype; Bitstream; Adobe; URW Type Foundry; Compugraphic
- Design based on: Bookman (typeface)
- Variations: Schneidler Mediaeval; Schneidler Initials

Stempel Schneidler is a serif typeface designed by calligrapher F.H. Ernst Schneidler in 1936, and released by the Bauer Type Foundry in Germany.

Although Stempel Schneidler does not follow any particular model, it was primarily influenced by Venetian typefaces from the Italian Renaissance. According to a Bauer Type Foundry specimen sheet pictured in Laurence King Publishing's book The Visual History of Type, the design was influenced by 19th century type designs like Bookman.

It was initially released as "Schneidler Mediaeval" in Germany; however, when the design was distributed to the United States, the name was changed to "Bauer Text". In 1956, an italic named Amalthea was released to complement it. At first it was created as a companion typeface; however, it was later bundled into the general family.

The shapes of Stempel Schneidler have x-heights that harmonize with the ascenders and large capitals reminiscent of Nicolas Jenson's work. Contrast in strokes is minimal. Certain letters like the capital 'O' and 'Q' are almost geometric in style. The junctions are rounded to align with the terminals, which show small concave indentations.

The design was popular in and outside the United States and Germany, and due to its widespread use, it was revived by Linotype and Adobe as a digital typeface. Stempel Schneidler is included in the book 30 Essential Typefaces for a Lifetime (Rockport Publishers, 2006).

== Digital copies ==
The face was expanded into digital in the early 1980s by the type foundry D. Stempel AG, and was renamed Stempel Schneidler. Four additional weights from light to black were added, and it is this version of the typeface that much of the world still uses today. It was later cloned by other foundries like URW, Bitstream, and Compugraphic. URW's version reverted to the name Schneidler Mediaeval. It also adds a set of small caps. Compugraphic's version is slightly taller.

== Reception ==
Stempel Schneidler has been criticized by type and design historian Paul Shaw in his 2011 article "Flawed Typefaces". Shaw noted the design of the question mark was strange, as "it appears to be upside down". Shaw ultimately discusses the typeface's likability: "For those who like the typeface, the question mark is its flaw. But for those who dislike Schneidler—and there are reasons, ranging from its overtly cupped serifs to its capital O—the weird question mark is no big deal."

In 2015, Rob Saunders, founder of the San Francisco-based graphic design museum Letterform Archive, gave a presentation at The Cooper Union on the life of Ernst Schneidler and said of the typeface: "It's a beautiful thing. I always say if I'm ever tempted to use Souvenir, I'll use this instead. It has a little bit of that fullness and simple structure, but it's just so much more graceful."
