= Johann Bauer =

Johann Bauer may refer to:

- Johann Bauer (soldier) (1916–1974), German World War II Knight's Cross recipient
- Johann Hermann Bauer (1861–1891), Austrian chess master
- Johann Christian Bauer (1802–1867), German type designer and punchcutter
