= Patachou, Petit Garçon =

Patachou, Petit Garçon (published in 1929) is a collection of articles, prose, and poems by Tristan Derème about the everyday life of a curious and mischievous child. It is a probable inspiration for Le Petit Prince by Antoine de Saint-Exupéry.
