= Walter Baum =

German type designer, graphic artist and teacher

- Born: 23 May 1921; Gummersbach, Germany
- Died: 8 March 2007 (aged 85); Bad Soden, Germany
- Known for: typography

Walter Baum (23 May 1921 – 8 March 2007) was a German type designer, graphic artist and teacher. Baum trained as a typesetter from 1935 to 1939. He resumed his studies after World War II before becoming head of the graphics studio at the Bauer Type Foundry in 1948. There, he collaborated with Konrad Friedrich Bauer in designing many typefaces, including Fortune, the first Clarendon typeface with a matching italic. From 1972 to 1986 he was director of the Kunstschule Westend in Frankfurt am Main.

== Fonts Designed by Walter Baum ==
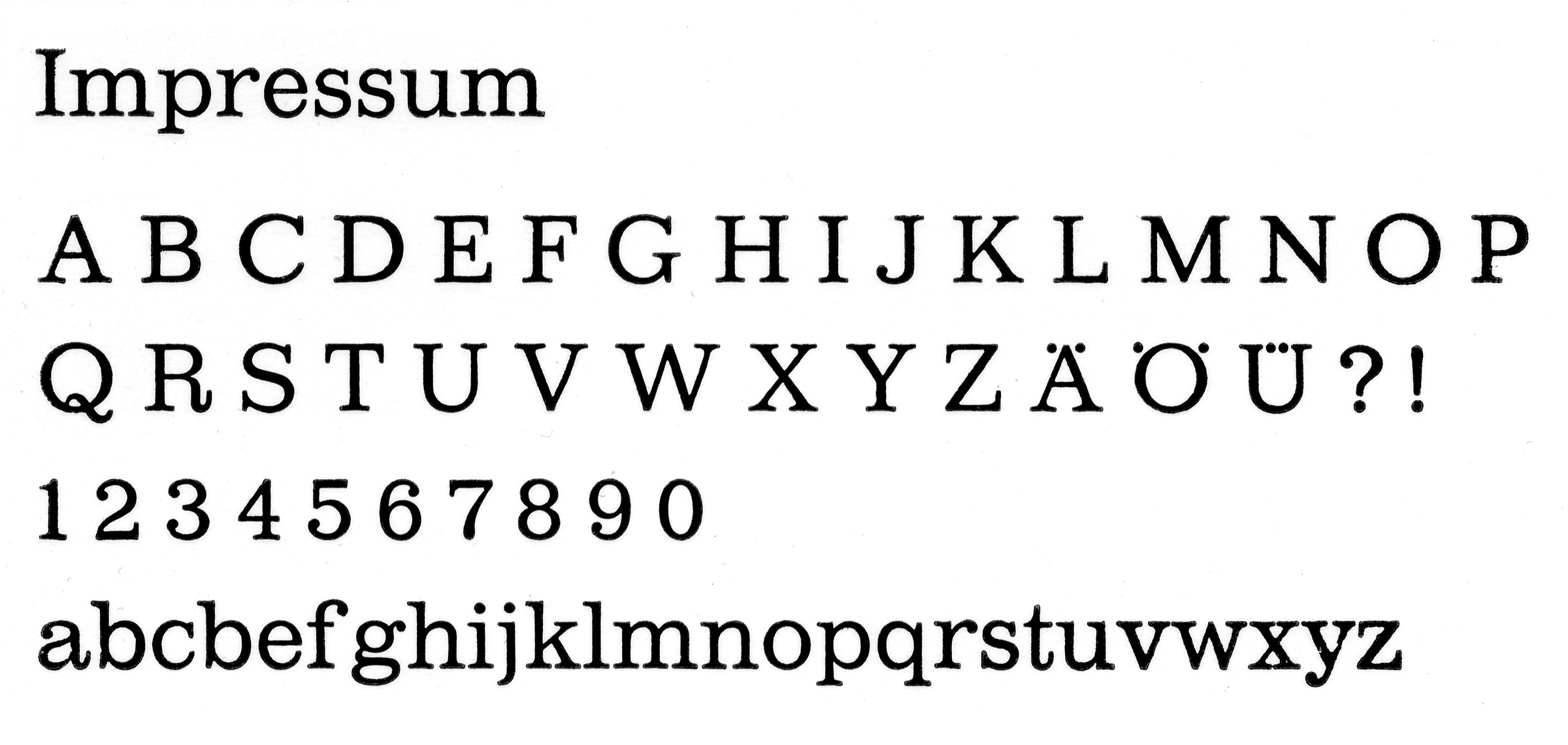
Letterpress print of Impressum regular.

All faces were designed in collaboration with Konrad Friedrich Bauer.

- Alpha (Bauer, 1954)
- Beta (Bauer, 1954), an alternate set of lower-case letters for Alpha.
- Folio (Bauer and Intertype, 1956–63), also sold as Caravelle by Founderie Typographique Francaise.
- Imprimatur (Bauer, and Intertype, 1952–55) also sold as Horizon by Founderie Typographique Francaise
- Fortune or Volta (Bauer 1955)
- Impressum (Amsterdam Type foundry and Bauer 1962)
