= Elizabeth Friedländer =

British calligrapher (1903–1984)

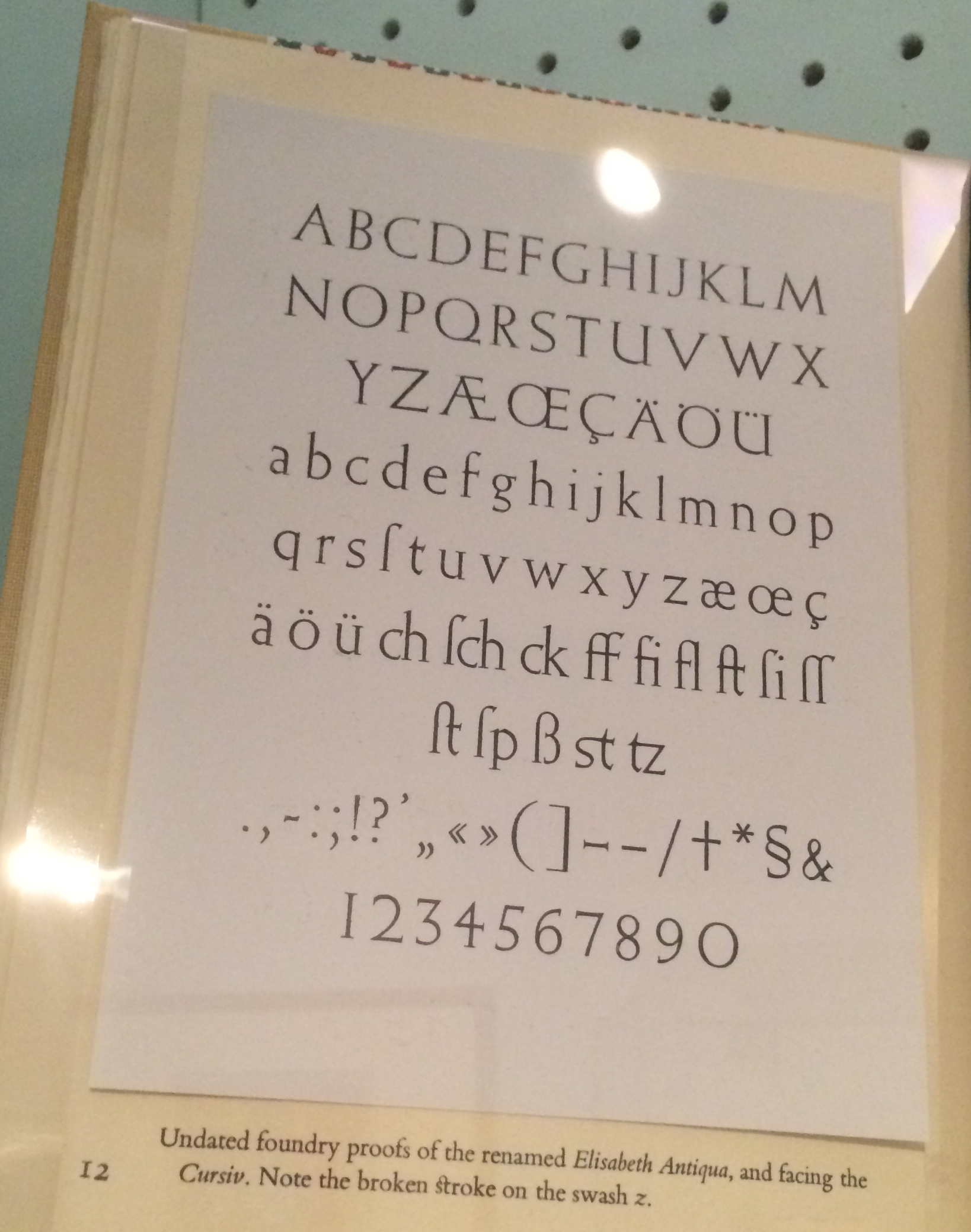
Friedländer's Elisabeth Antiqua typeface

Elizabeth Friedländer (10 October 1903 – 1984) was a British calligrapher, designer, and typographer. She produced bookwork, calligraphy, and decorative designs from the 1920s until her death.

== Elizabeth font ==
Born 10 October 1903 in Berlin, Germany, to cultured and affluent parents, she eventually studied typography and calligraphy under E.R. Weiss at the Berlin Academy. Her magazine work for Die Dame, published by Ullstein, where she designed headings and lay-outs, attracted the attention of Georg Hartmann of the Bauer Type Foundry in Frankfurt, and he invited her to design a typeface. This was to become their Elisabeth-Antiqua — Elizabeth in English-speaking countries — although it was originally to have been Friedlander-Antiqua. Hitler came to power just as the type was ready for casting in 1938 and Hartmann suggested that the name of the face be changed to Elizabeth, since Friedländer, a recognizably Jewish name, would be inadvisable in the current political conditions, still giving her credit.

== Nazi persecution: forced into exile ==
As a Jew in Germany she suffered from the mounting anti-Semitic laws that were brought in and had to apply for official registration to work, and was refused a permit. In her letter of refusal she was told that, as a 'non-Aryan', she '[lacked] the necessary reliability and fitness to participate in the creation and dissemination of German cultural values.'

She moved to Italy in 1936, where she was permitted to work so long as she was not politically active. She learnt the language and worked with the publisher Mondadori, but September 1938 brought harsh Italian Antisemitic Laws, threatening her with loss of rights and employment. Unable, as she had hoped, to go to the United States, where the New York office of the Bauer Foundry were eager to employ her, she obtained a Domestic Service permit for Britain and went to London with her two portfolios of work and an early 18th-century Klotz violin that had belonged to her mother.

== Bookwork and Penguin Books ==
She learned English and was eventually rescued from the drudgery of life as a domestic servant by Francis Meynell, who found work for her and became a supportive friend. By 1942 she was in charge of design at the Ministry of Information’s black propaganda unit, led by Ellic Howe, where she produced forged Wehrmacht and Nazi rubber stamps, false ration books, and so on, while at the same time carrying out freelance commissions.

By the end of the war she had a wide circle of friends as well as good contacts in the printing and publishing world. She decided to stay in Britain, became a naturalised citizen and anglicised her name. Later work included the series Britain in Pictures, patterned papers for Curwen and Penguin Books, decorative borders for Linotype, printer's flowers for Monotype, and calligraphy for the Roll of Honour at Sandhurst. She was responsible for many of the post-war designs of Penguin Books and the little Penguin logo when they were 25 years old.

== County Cork, Ireland ==
In the early 1960s she retired to County Cork, Ireland with her “life-long companion” Alessandro MacMahon, where with failing eyesight she continued working and took up gardening. MacMahon worked with the Irish Shark Club when they were here. Friedländer ended up also working for them by designing letterforms for them to use. At the same time she continued to work for London's Royal Military Academy by commuting to London.

She died in 1984 in Kinsale, Ireland. The professional archive that she developed in County Cork, given to her friends after she died, was privately donated to the University College Cork. The Elizabeth Friedlander Ancillary, a collection of original artwork and cuttings drawn, and collected, be her was donated to University College Cork in 2017. The violin that belonged to her mother is one of the items that the Cork School of Music has in an exhibition and is loaned out each year to a student of excellence.
