= Folio (typeface) =

Neo-grotesque sans-serif typeface

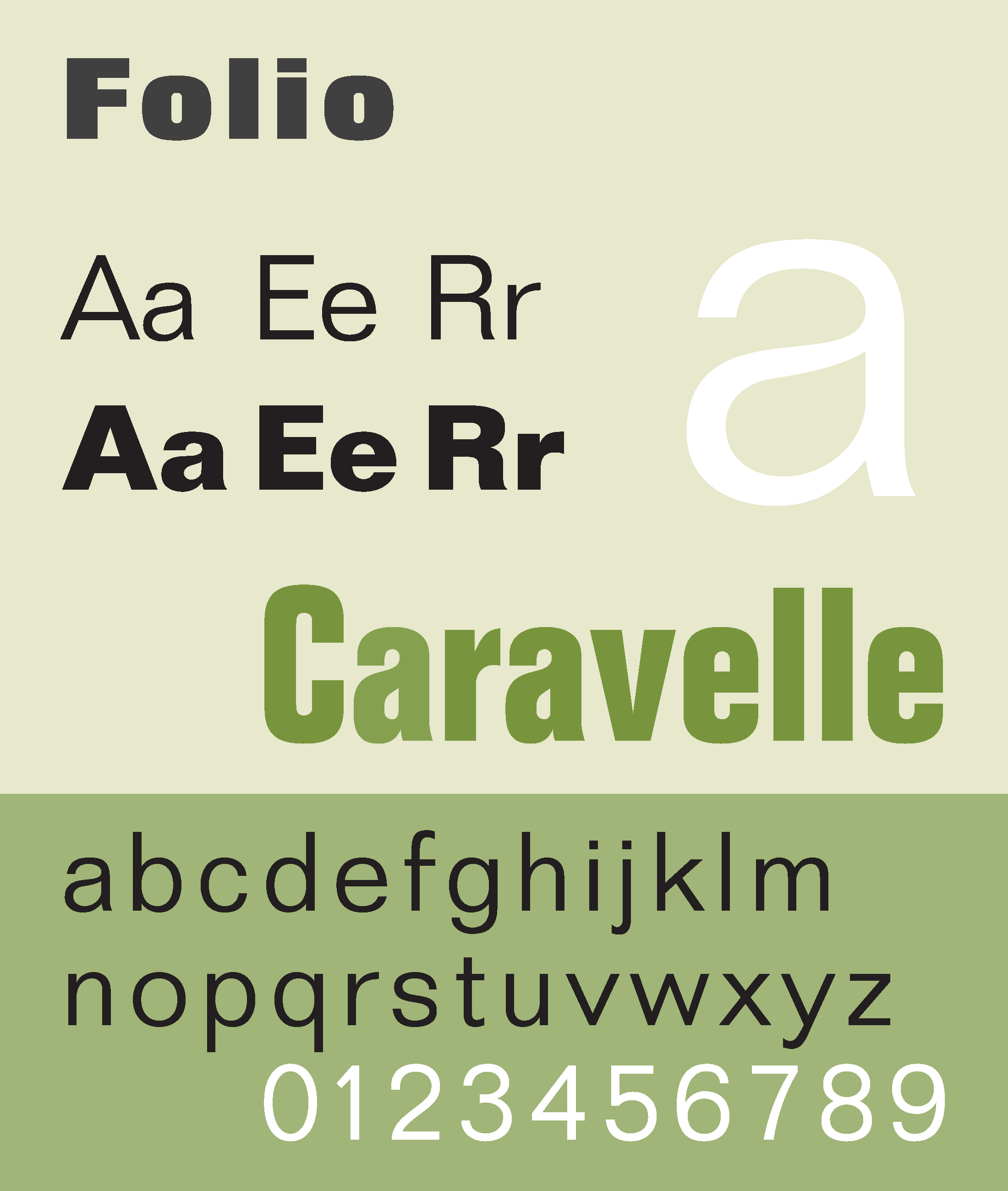
- Category: Sans-serif
- Classification: Neo-grotesque
- Designers: Konrad Friedrich Bauer; Walter Baum
- Foundry: Bauer Type Foundry
- Date released: 1957

Folio is a sans-serif typeface in the neo-grotesque style designed by Konrad Friedrich Bauer and Walter Baum in 1957 for the Bauer Type Foundry (German: Bauersche Gießerei). Bauer licensed the design to Fonderie Typographique Française for sale in France under the name Caravelle.

Folio is considered part of the International Typographic Style, with Helvetica and Univers also released at the same time. All three are modeled after Akzidenz-Grotesk. However, Folio more closely follows the original model than the other two, which have larger x-heights. The typeface experienced moderate success in the United States. The typeface family was extended in 1963, adding an Extra Bold weight and a Bold Condensed width. Bauer released 17 styles of Folio between 1956 and 1969.

Folio Extended (Folio Halbfett) included alternate versions of upper case A, E, M, N, and R.

The cold type version was issued by Hell AG.

== Bibliography ==
- Jaspert, Berry and Johnson. Encyclopaedia of Type Faces. Cassell Paperback, London; 2001. ISBN 1-84188-139-2.
- Macmillan, Neil. An A–Z of Type Designers. Yale University Press: 2006. ISBN 0-300-11151-7.
