= Emil Rudolf Weiß =

German graphic designer

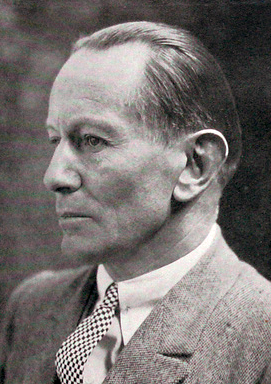
Emil Rudolf Weiß (1920s)

Emil Rudolf Weiß (or Weiss; 12 October 1875, Lahr – 7 November 1942, Meersburg) was a German painter, typographer, graphic artist and poet.

== Biography ==
His father was a police officer and he grew up in Breisach and Baden-Baden. From 1893 to 1896, he studied at the Academy of Fine Arts, Karlsruhe, with Robert Poetzelberger. In 1895, he published his first album of works and a volume of lyric poetry. After leaving Karlsruhe, he studied at the Académie Julian in Paris. Together with Félix Vallotton, he illustrated a calendar book called Der bunte Vogel (The Colorful Bird).

He then returned to Karlsruhe before going to Stuttgart, where he worked with Hans Thoma and Leopold Graf von Kalckreuth. In 1899, he went back to Paris with his friend, Karl Hofer. From 1902 to 1909, he enjoyed the patronage of the Swiss industrialist, Theodor Reinhart. During that time, he also designed trading cards for the Stollwerck chocolate company. He married a singer named Johanna Schwan in 1903.

After his marriage, Karl Ernst Osthaus employed him at the painting school of the Folkwang-Museums in Hagen. He was also involved in designing books for S. Fischer Verlag. In 1904, he participated in the first exhibition of the Deutscher Künstlerbund at the Staatliche Antikensammlungen and provided illustrations for Der Buntscheck, a children's book by Richard Dehmel. In 1907, with a recommendation from Bruno Paul, he was appointed to the teaching center at the Kunstgewerbemuseum Berlin and he joined the Berlin Secession.

He was named a Professor at the Kunstgewerbemuseum's school in 1910, where he taught decorative painting and sketching until 1933. He divorced Johanna in 1914 and was conscripted in 1917, although he was quickly dismissed from service due to a heart problem. That same year, he married the sculptor, Renée Sintenis.

He became a member of the Prussian Academy of Arts in 1922. Two years later, he designed the reverse of the new 1, 2, 3 and 5 Reichsmark coins. Several publishers collaborated on a Festschrift on the occasion of his fiftieth birthday.

He also designed numerous typefaces, including Weiß-Fraktur (1913), Weiß-Antiqua (1928, designed for the Bauer Type Foundry), Weiß-Gotisch (1936) und Weiß-Rundgotisch (1937).

In 1933, the Nazi régime revoked his Lehramt (teaching credentials) and he withdrew to his home in Baden-Baden, where he concentrated on writing. In 1936, he took part in the last annual exhibition of the Deutscher Künstlerbund in Hamburg, which was closed by the "Reichskammer der bildenden Künste", a division of the Reichskulturkammer. The following year, he was expelled from the Academy of Arts.

He died on 7 November 1942 in Meersburg, aged 67, after suffering a heart attack and was buried, at his request, in Bernau im Schwarzwald. A memorial exhibition was held in Freiburg im Breisgau, after its liberation in 1944. Many of his works were lost during the war.

== Gallery ==
Selected artworks
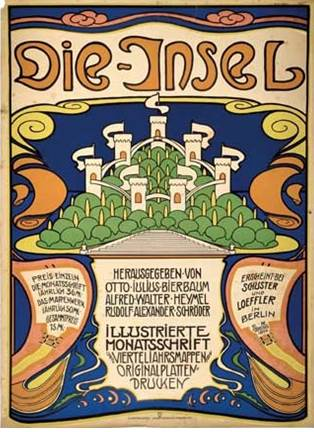
Poster for Die Insel theater, Karlsruhe

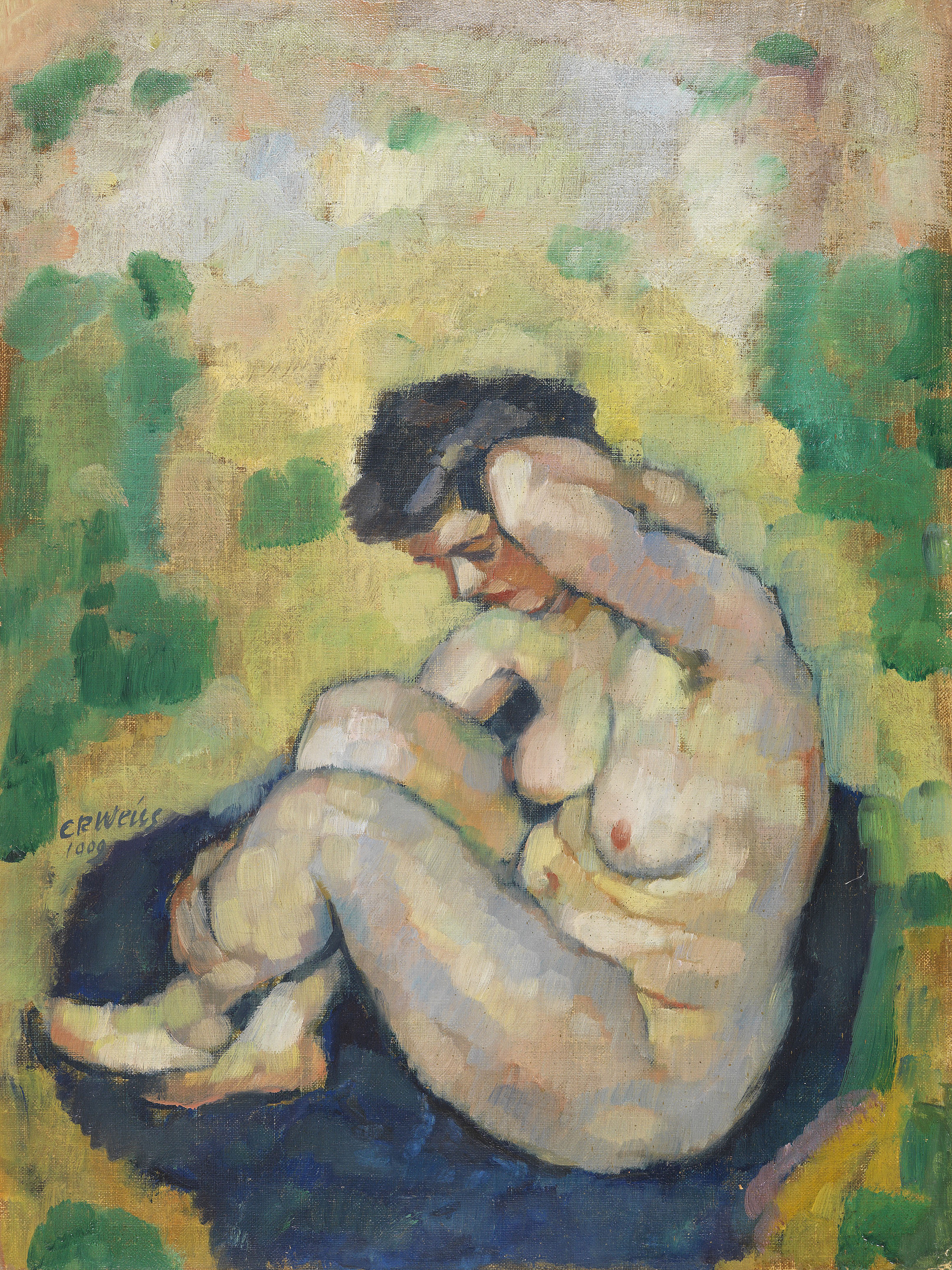
Nude

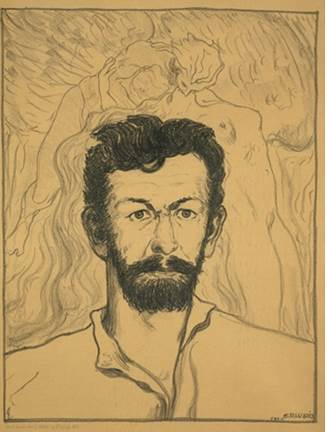
Portrait of Richard Dehmel

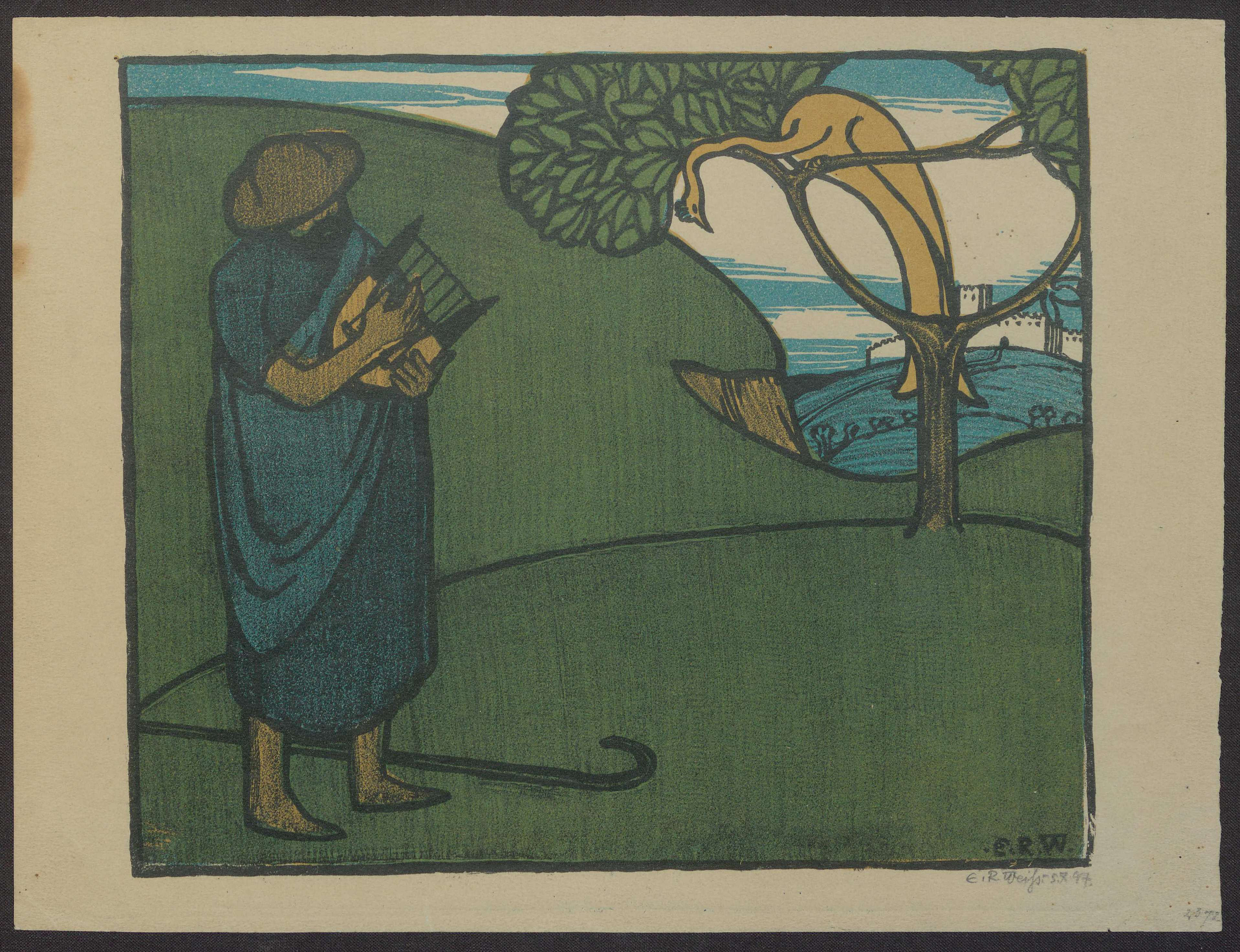
„Der Hirte“, 1897
