= Edwin W. Shaar =

American writer and graphics artist

- Born: January 1, 1915; Zion, Maryland, United States
- Died: April 26, 2001 (aged 86); College Station, Texas, United States
- Known for: Typography
- Notable work: Flash

Edwin W. Shaar (January 1, 1915 – April 26, 2001) was an American writer, graphic artist and typeface designer. He was an assistant art director at Lanston Monotype before becoming director of the type design program at Intertype. He also designed Phototypesetting faces.

== Typefaces ==
Shaar designed the following foundry types:

- Czarin (Baltimore Type Foundry, 1939)
- Flash + Flash Bold (Lanston Monotype. 1939)
- Additions to Intertype's Futura series including:
  - Futura Book Oblique
  - Futura Demibold Oblique
  - Futura Extra Bold (1952)
  - Futura Script (1954)
  - Futura Extra Bold Oblique (1955, with Tommy Thompson)
  - Futura Extra Bold Condensed
  - Futura Extra Bold Condensed Oblique
- Imperial + Imperial Italic (Intertype, 1957) Used by The New York Times since 1967. Later marketed as Gazette (Linotype, 1977).
- Nuptial Script (Intertype, 1952)
- Royal + Royal Italic + Royal Bold (Intertype, 1960)
- Satellite + Satellite Italic + Satellite Bold (Intertype, 1974)
- Valiant (Lanston Monotype, 1941)
- Additions to Intertype's Vogue series including:
  - Vogue Extra Condensed
- Windsor + Windsor Bold (Intertype, 1960) A newspaper face unrelated to a face of the same name by Stephenson Blake.

Shaar also designed these fotofonts:

- Shaar Diane (Photo-Lettering Inc.)
