= Tommy Thompson (type designer) =

- Born: Samuel Winfield Thompson; 1906; Blue Point, New York, U.S.
- Died: 1967 (aged 60–61); New York City, New York, U.S.
- Known for: Typography
- Notable work: Thompson Quill Script

Samuel Winfield "Tommy" Thompson (1906–1967) was an American calligrapher, graphic artist and typeface designer. He was born Blue Point, New York. In 1944 he became the first designer to earn royalties for a type design, from Photo Lettering Inc. for his Thompson Quill Script. Previously, designers had worked in house for foundries or had sold the rights to their faces outright. He maintained a studio in Norwalk, Connecticut and was the author of several books on type and lettering.

== Typefaces ==
Thompson designed all of these foundry types:

- Post Headletter (1943, Monotype), privately cast for The Saturday Evening Post.
- Collier Heading (1946, Monotype), privately cast for Collier's magazine.
- Mademoiselle (1953, Baltimore Type Foundry), matrices cut by Herman Schnorr. Originally cast for Mademoiselle magazine, but later offered for general sale.
- Baltimore Script (1955, Baltimore Type Foundry), matrices cut by George Battee.
- Additional weights of Futura for Intertype (1950s).
- Thompson Quill Script (1953, American Type Founders), this was also made available for phototypesetting by Photo Lettering Inc.

In addition, he prepared a version of Baskerville for the ATF Typesetter; this was the first 7-unit typeface for the machine, which previously used 5-unit typefaces similar to those used by the Justowriter on which it was built. (Later, in 1964, the ATF Typesetter Model B-8, offered an 18-increment system allowing further improved typesetting.)

== Books ==
- The script letter; its form, construction and application, New York, The Studio Publications Inc., 1939.
- The ABC Of Our Alphabet, 1945.
- How to render roman letter forms. A pattern for understanding and drawing roman letters and other styles of lettering and type faces related to them, New York, American Studio Books, 1946.
- Basic layout design; a pattern for understanding the basic motifs in design and how to apply them to graphic art problems, New York, Studio Publications, in association with Crowell, c. 1950.
