= Heinrich Jost =

German typographer and graphic designer

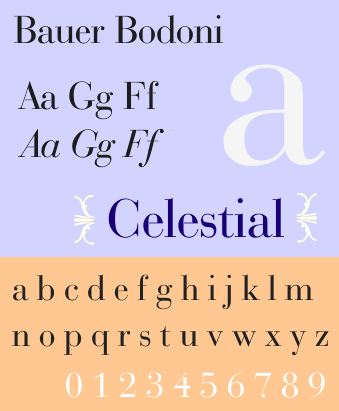
Bauer Bodoni, one of the best-known typefaces designed by Jost

Heinrich Jost (13 October 1889 – 27 September 1948) was a German typographer and graphic designer. He was the art director of the Bauer Type Foundry from 1923 until 1948.

== Biography ==
Jost was born in 1889 to a bookbinder father in Magdeburg, where he attended the Kunstgewerbe- und Handwerkerschule Magdeburg and trained as a bookseller. In 1908 he moved to Munich and began studying book production at the Debschitz-Schule in 1911 under the tutelage of Paul Renner and Emil Preetorius. He worked as a freelance type designer from 1914 onwards; his clients included the newspaper Münchner Neueste Nachrichten and other publications.

In 1923 Jost was invited by Georg Hartmann to become the art director of the Bauer Type Foundry in Frankfurt am Main. He directed Bauer during its most successful period, until 1948. At Bauer, he oversaw the work of designers such as Paul Renner, Lucian Bernhard and Imre Reiner. Jost personally designed several typefaces for Bauer: Atrax (1926), Bauer Bodoni (1926), and Beton (c. 1931–1936). He also designed Jost Mediaeval for Ludwig & Mayer (1927–1929) and a revival of Fraktur for Monotype (1938). Beton was popular among advertisers, while Bauer Bodoni, which was created as a rival to Morris Fuller Benton's ATF Bodoni, is generally regarded by typographers as the most faithful revival of Giambattista Bodoni's original typeface. His other designs include Aeterna (1927) and Georg Hartmann Antiqua (1948).

Jost died in 1948 in Frankfurt am Main. A collection of his work has since been displayed at Klingspor Museum in Offenbach am Main.
