= Neufville Typefoundry =

Spanish type foundry

Fundición Tipográfica Neufville
- Type: Font
- Industry: Type foundry
- Headquarters: Barcelona, Spain

Fundición Tipográfica Neufville or the Neufville Typefoundry is a type foundry in Barcelona and the most important supplier of the printing industry in Spain during the 20th century.

== History ==
Discovered punches and matrices testify that the origin of the company goes back to the 16th century, when German printers brought Gutenberg's invention to Spain. The foundry belonged to the convent of San José of Barcelona and in the year 1880 became property of the printing house Narciso Ramírez y Rialp, who sold it in 1885 to the Frankfurt am Main-based Bauer Type Foundry (Bauersche Giesserei). The company continued its operations under the name of J. de Neufville, directed by Jacobo de Neufville, who belonged to a patrician family from Frankfurt, which was involved in the company. He was soon removed from the business for health reasons, and the company became known as “Sucesores de J. de Neufville”.

In 1922, Carlos Hartmann, son of Georg Hartmann, the owner of the Bauer Type Foundry, turned the company into a Spanish-law society under the name of Fundición Tipográfica Neufville, SA. Under his direction the company started distributing the most prestigious German Printing Machinery, thus acquiring a great popularity in Spain's graphic world.

Contributing to the company's reputation were its educational publications, such as “Anuario Neufville”, published since 1910, and, since 1920, “Crónica Poligráfica”, directed by Eudald Canibell.

In the field of Typography, Neufville cast, using matrices received from the Bauer Type Foundry, the creations of Lucian Bernhard, E. R. Weiss, Ernst Schneidler, Imre Reiner, Paul Renner, Heinrich Jost, Dr. Konrad Bauer, and Walter Baum. “Futura”, designed by Paul Renner in 1924, was the one that obtained the most international success, becoming possibly the best-selling typeface of all time. An example of its prominence is the fact that in 1969 the first astronauts to land on the Moon placed a plaque with an inscription made in Futura.

From the 1960s, Letterpress printing started to decline in favor of Offset printing. New procedures of text composition appeared—first photocomposition and then desktop publishing from digital sources—which were more rational than those using lead types. But, despite the odds, the Neufville Typefoundry managed to maintain a strong production of lead types through acquisitions of prominent foundries: Fundición Tipográfica Nacional in 1971, the Bauer Type Foundry in 1972, Fonderie Typographique Française in 1974, matrices of the Lettergieterij Amsterdam in 1984, Ludwig & Mayer in 1985, and Fonderies Tyographiques Réunies del Líbano (United Type Foundries of Lebanon) in 1988. In 1974, it opened a branch near Paris, Neufville France, to supply lead types to France, Algeria, Morocco, and Tunisia, an activity that lasted until 1995.

The acquisitions allowed the company not only to maintain its activity supplying fonts for a longer period than its ex-competitors, but also to have an advantage over the longer term due to the intellectual property for the typefaces of the acquired companies, as well as of their Trademarks. In 1980, already in the beginning of the digital age, Neufville signed agreements with computer font producers for a wide range of its own typefaces, as well as those of the undertakings it had absorbed.

Fundición Tipográfica Neufville, SA was dissolved in 1995. Some of its older punches and matrices were deposited in the Department of Design and Image at the University of Barcelona; a few years later other matrices and foundry machinery were deposited at the Sala Temática of the Provincial Council of Lleida; and, finally, in 2005, the latest arrays that made up the main foundry program were acquired by the Imprenta Municipal—Artes del Libro at the Madrid's city council.

After the company was closed, its successor, Bauer Types SL, continued the casting of lead types for a few years and, in 1998, signed an agreement with the Dutch company Visualogik BV with locations in The Netherlands and France, for the digitization and marketing of the fonts under the name of Neufville Digital.
