= Johann Christian Bauer =

- Born: 1802; Hanau, Germany
- Died: 1867 (aged 64–65); Frankfurt am Main, Germany
- Known for: typography
- Notable work: Fette Fraktur

Johann Christian Bauer (1802–1867) was a German type designer, punchcutter, and founder of the Bauer Type Foundry. Bauer was born in Hanau and began working as a punch-cutter in 1827. He ran a type foundry in Frankfurt am Main, Germany for three years with Christian Nies, before founding the Bauersche Gießerei in 1837. From 1837 to 1847 he worked for the firm of P.A. Wilson in Edinburgh, where he could study punch-cutting and type founding, as Great Britain was at that time in the forefront of the industry. While still in Edinburgh, he founded the firm of Bauer, Furgusson et Huie, though upon his return to Germany in 1847 the foundry was renamed Englische Schriftschneiderei und Gravieranstalt (English Typecutting and Engraving Works). A prolific craftsman, Bauer cut more than 10,000 punches with his own hands, though few of his designs are in use today as they are typical of the excesses of pre-Arts and Crafts Movement nineteenth century design. By the end of his life, the Bauer foundry was a worldwide concern.

== Fonts Designed by Johann Christian Bauer ==
All faces cast by the Bauer Type Foundry.

- Fette Fraktur (1850)
- Roman Extra Bold (1850)
- Verdi (1851, revived 1957)
