= Ken Holt =

Juvenile mystery book series

- Volume 1
- Author: Sam Epstein; Beryl Epstein
- Country: United States
- Language: English
- Genre: Mystery
- Publisher: Grosset & Dunlap
- Published: 1949-1963
- Media type: Print

Ken Holt is the central character in a series of mystery stories advertised as being for readers between the ages of eleven and fifteen years old. The series was published by Grosset & Dunlap between 1949 and 1963, and the mysteries continued to be sold in the United States until at least 1966.

== Authors ==
Husband and wife Sam Epstein and Beryl Williams Epstein, who were the authors of over one hundred books for children and teenagers, wrote the Ken Holt books under the pseudonym of Bruce Campbell. (The name was inspired by a dog and a can of soup.) Beryl stated that "Sam does the technical chapters, and I do the 'blah' ones in between."

== Series synopsis ==
The series advertising tagline was "Ken Holt, son of a world-famous correspondent, stumbles into a world of mystery and intrigue." In the Secret of Skeleton Island, the first book in the series, it is stated that Ken's mother died ten years before the story takes place. Ken is kidnapped, then escapes, and is helped by the Allen family, who own the Brentwood Advance, a weekly newspaper. In the last chapter it is decided that Ken will live with the Allen family, since his father is often away. Ken and Sandy Allen become best friends, and investigate mysteries together.

== Editions ==
Grosset & Dunlap published the series in three formats. From 1949 - 1950 the first four books were bound in tan covers, and had a color illustrated dust jacket. From 1951 - 1963 the first seventeen books were bound in gray covers, with color illustrated dust jackets. Both of those formats had book spines with an illustration of Ken Holt's head in a shield-shaped frame. From 1962 and onward books one through four, six, fifteen, and eighteen were published with picture covers that had an orange spine.

In the United Kingdom the series was published by World Distributors of Manchester during the 1950s and 60s. This edition was bound in red cloth with black titles, and had an Illustrated dust jacket.

== Books in series ==
| # | Title | Year | Synopsis |
|---|---|---|---|
| 1 | The Secret of Skeleton Island | 1949 | When Richard Holt, Ken Holt's father, doesn't return home as planned the young man travels to New York to find him. He is kidnapped along the way, escapes and is helped by the Allen family, owners of the Brentwood Advance newspaper. Sandy Allen helps Ken investigate Mr. Holt's disappearance. |
| 2 | The Riddle of the Stone Elephant | 1949 | Ken Holt and Sandy Allen go on a Rocky Mountain holiday, and research a Colorado land feud for a feature story Richard Holt is writing. |
| 3 | The Black Thumb Mystery | 1950 | Though Ken and Sandy testified against Frank Brown, who was convicted of aiding a bank robbery, they believe Mr. Brown may have been framed for the crime. |
| 4 | The Clue of the Marked Claw | 1950 | Ted Bateson invites school friends Ken and Sandy to spend a week in Long Island. They investigate why the Batesons' lobster pots are being robbed. |
| 5 | The Clue of the Coiled Cobra | 1951 | When Ken and Sandy drive home after covering a dog show for the Brentwood Weekly Advance they offer a hitch-hiker a lift. Later on a private investigator comes to the newspaper office and states the hitch-hiker is wanted for a robbery. |
| 6 | The Secret of Hangman's Inn | 1951 | Joe Driscoll, a worker at the Brentwood Weekly Advance, disappears and Ken and Sandy search for the missing man. After the teens discover some clues Brentwood Police Chief Andy Kane joins the investigation. |
| 7 | The Mystery of the Iron Box | 1952 | Ken's father, Richard Holt, stays with the Allens at Christmas time, and brings gifts, including a decorative iron box for Ma Allen. It soon appears that someone is interested in stealing the box. |
| 8 | The Clue of the Phantom Car | 1953 | The mayor of Brentwood dedicates a new lakeside playground, and the Allens are on hand to cover the story for their newspaper. Afterwards Sandy and Ken are returning home when they rescue Ralph Conner from his wrecked truck. The Connors have had a streak of bad luck, and the accident could cause the Conner Brother Trucking Company to lose its insurance coverage, which would be the end of their business. |
| 9 | The Mystery of the Galloping Horse | 1954 | Ken and Sandy join an archaeological expedition dig near the Delaware Bay. They learn that expedition members have heard galloping hoof beats at night. The locals refer to the strange hoof beats as the ghost of the galloping horse. |
| 10 | The Mystery of the Green Flame | 1955 | En route to Mexico City to meet Richard Holt, Ken and Sandy witness a mysterious green flame. Later the teens come across a possible criminal hide-out. |
| 11 | The Mystery of the Grinning Tiger | 1956 | Ken and Sandy receive a fan letter from Timothy Crandall, a reclusive young millionaire. The teens are assigned the job of getting an interview and photos for a news story on the wealthy young man. When they arrive at Timothy's mansion they discover the recluse has disappeared. |
| 12 | The Mystery of the Vanishing Magician | 1956 | The Allens attend a fund raiser at Brentwood High School, where Magnus the Magician is to perform. Bert Allen recognizes him as someone who once saved his life, but was never properly thanked. When Bert volunteers to help out in a trick, he reveals himself to Magnus, who is startled, and disappears during the middle of his act. The Allens learn the man is wanted for robbing a jewelry store, and they vow to prove he is innocent. |
| 13 | The Mystery of the Shattered Glass | 1958 | Ken and Sandy board a freighter for trip to Europe, to join Ken's father, a foreign correspondent for Global News Service. The teens receive a radio message from Global News and find themselves involved in a crime committed a thousand miles away. |
| 14 | The Mystery of the Invisible Enemy | 1959 | Ken and Sandy Allen are sent to cover the annual Halloween party for the employees of the Brentwood Foundry and Casting Company. The teens find themselves matching wits with a criminal who seems to anticipate their every move to uncover his identity. |
| 15 | The Mystery of Gallows Cliff | 1960 | Ken and Sandy visit an archaeological dig in the small town of Gallows Cliff, Arizona. They discover Gallows Cliff is a way station in a smuggling operation between Mexico and the United States. |
| 16 | The Clue of the Silver Scorpion | 1961 | Ken and Sandy spot someone trying to break into their convertible. The teens suspect that the person wants to steal an unknown item in their possession. Their only clue is a silver scorpion cuff link. |
| 17 | The Mystery of the Plumed Serpent | 1962 | After Ken and Sandy Allen drive to the bus stop to meet a visitor from Mexico, they soon discover that mystery and danger follow Ricardo Montez. |
| 18 | The Mystery of the Sultan's Scimitar | 1963 | Ken and Sandy take a vacation in Greece. Minutes after they view the Knossos cylinder, which is the Golden Key to the language of the ancient Cretans, the artifact is stolen from the Athens Museum. |
