= Bauersche Gießerei =

German type foundry

- Type: Aktiengesellschaft
- Industry: Type foundry
- Founded: 1837
- Founder: Johann Christian Bauer
- Defunct: 1972
- Headquarters: Frankfurt am Main, Germany
- Key people: Konrad Friedrich Bauer, Walter Baum, Heinrich Jost

Bauersche Gießerei (lit. 'Bauer Type Foundry') was a German type foundry founded in 1837 by Johann Christian Bauer in Frankfurt am Main. Noted typeface designers, among them Lucian Bernhard, Konrad Friedrich Bauer (not related to the company's founder), Walter Baum, Heinrich Jost, Imre Reiner, Friedrich Hermann Ernst Schneidler, Emil Rudolf Weiß, and Heinrich Wienyck, designed typefaces for the company.

The company nearly went bankrupt at the end of the 19th century because the company's administration assumed that type founding, rather than typesetting, would be automated. The new owner, Georg Hartmann, succeeded in saving the company. Subsequently, the company grew, also due to several takeovers, e.g. in 1916 by Frankfurt's type foundry Flinsch, itself a global player. In 1927, an office was opened in New York City. In 1944, the American subsidiary was placed under the Alien Property Custodian.

In 1972, all activities of the headquarters in Frankfurt were reportedly ceased and transferred to the former subsidiary company, Neufville Typefoundry in Barcelona, after 1995 to Bauer Types, which still owns the rights to many typefaces. These are distributed by companies like Monotype, Adobe, Paratype, URW++, Elsner & Flake, as well as Neufville Digital for the typeface Futura ND.

== Typefaces ==
The following foundry types were issued by Bauer:

- **Alpha** (1954, Walter Baum + Konrad Friedrich Bauer)
- **Astoria** (1907), a copy of Inland Type Foundry's Comstock, revived in 1957
- **Atrax** (1926, Heinrich Jost)
- **Ballé Initials** (Maria Ballé), not actually cast as foundry type, but rather electrotypes mounted on metal
- **Baron** (1911), the italic version is called Baroness.
- **Bauer Classic Roman + Italic**
- **Bauer Topic**
  - Cast in medium, bold, medium itaic, and bold italic, with alternate, rounded characters, in the bold and medium.
- **Bernhard Antiqua** (1912, Lucian Bernhard)
- **Bernhard Brush Script** (1925, Lucian Bernhard)
- **Bernhard Cursive + Bold** (1925, Lucian Bernhard), also known as Madonna and Neon Cursive, also cast as "Madonna Ronde" by Stephenson Blake
- **Bernhard Fraktur** (1912–22, Lucian Bernhard)
- **Bernhard Handschrift** (1928, Lucian Bernhard)
- **Bernhard Roman + Italic** (1937, Lucian Bernhard)
- **Beta** (1954, Baum + Bauer), an alternate set of lower-case letters for Alpha.
- **Beton** (1931–36, Heinrich Jost), matrices also available for Intertype composition.
  - Cast in light, medium, bold, extrabold, medium condensed, bold condensed, and open.
- **Bodoni-Antiqua** (1926, Louis Höll)
  - Cast in roman, bold, extrabold, italic, bold italic, extrabold italic, and title.
- **Bremer Presse Roman** (1912, Willy Wiegand, matrices cut by Louis Höll), originally cast as a private type for the Bremer Presse by the Flinsch Type Foundry.
- **Cantate**
- **Cartoon** (1936, H.A. Trafton), known in Germany as Fresko.
  - Cast in light and bold.
- **Classic**, also known as Bauer Baskerville.
- **Columna** (1955, Max Caflisch)
- **Corvinus** (1929–34, Imre Reiner), the condensed version is called Skyline
  - Cast in light, italic light, medium, italic medium, and bold
- **Ehmcke** (1908, F. H. Ehmcke), originally cast by the Flinsch Foundry
- **Element, mager** (before 1936)
- **Elizabeth Roman + Italic** (1937, Elizabeth Friedländer)
- **Femina** (1927)
- **Flinsch-Fraktur** (before 1936)
- **Flinsch-Privat** (before 1936)
- **Folio** (1956–63, Baum + Bauer), also available in Intertype matrices, also sold as Caravelle by Fonderie Typographique Française
- **Fortune** or Volta (1955, Baum + Bauer)
  - Cast only in light, bold, bold italic, and extra bold; no medium was ever cast
- **Futura** (1927–30, Paul Renner), matrices also available for Intertype composition
  - Cast in light, book, medium, demibold, bold, oblique light, oblique medium, oblique condensed, bold condensed, display, black, and inline
- **Gillies Gothic** (1935, William S. Gillies), known in Germany as Flott
  - Cast only in bold and light; no medium was ever cast.
- **Hellenic Wide**
- **Horizon**
  - Cast in light, medium, bold, and light italic.
- **Hoyer-Fraktur** (before 1936)
  - Hoyer-Fraktur, schmalfelt (before 1936)
- **Hyperion** (1931, Berthold Wolpe)
- **Impressum** (1962, Baum + Bauer), also sold by the Amsterdam Type foundry
- **Imprimatur** (1952–55, Baum + Bauer), also available in Intertype matrices, also sold as Horizon by Fonderie Typographique Française.
- **Kleukens Antiqua** (c. 1900, F W. Kleukens)
- **Legend** (1937, F. H. Ernst Schneidler), known in Germany as Legende
  - Cast in light and bold
- **Lilli** (1930, Lucian Bernhard), also known as "Lilith"
- **Lucian series** (1925, Lucian Bernhard), later digitized as Belucian by Font Bureau
  - Lucian + italic also known as Graphic Light
  - Lucian Bold + italic also known as Graphic Bold
- **Manuskript-Gotisch** (before 1936)
- **Maxime**
- **Menhart-Antiqua and Kursiv** (before 1936)
- **Negro** (1930, Lucian Bernhard), later digitized as Berlin Sans by Font Bureau
  - Negrona, remastered version of Negro by Tipo Pèpel
- **Renata-Schwabacher** (before 1936)
- **Stempel Schneidler** (released by F.H. Ernst Schneidler in 1936, based on fifteenth-century serif Venetian typefaces)
- **Stradivarius**
- **Trafton Script** (1933, H.A. Trafton), known in Germany as Quick and in France as Etoile
- **Vendôme** (1962, François Ganeau) originally released by Fonderie Olive in 1954
- **Venus**
  - Cast in light, medium, bold, extra bold, extended, medium extended, bold extended, extra bold extended, light italic, medium italic, bold italic, light condensed, bold condensed, extrabold condensed
- **Volta** (see Fortune)
- **Weiß-Antiqua or Weiss Roman** (1926, Emil Rudolf Weiss), matrices also available for Intertype composition
  - Cast in roman, roman bold, italic with either swash or plain capitals, roman extrabold, and three series of initials
- **Weiß-Gotisch** (before 1936)
- **Weiß-Fraktur** (before 1936)
  - Lichte Weiß-Fraktur (before 1936)
- **Weiß-Rundgotisch** (before 1936)
- **Wieynck-Fraktur** (before 1936)
- **Zentenar-Fraktur** (before 1936)
  - Halbfette Zentenar-Fraktur (before 1936)
