= Type foundry =

Company that designs typefaces (fonts)

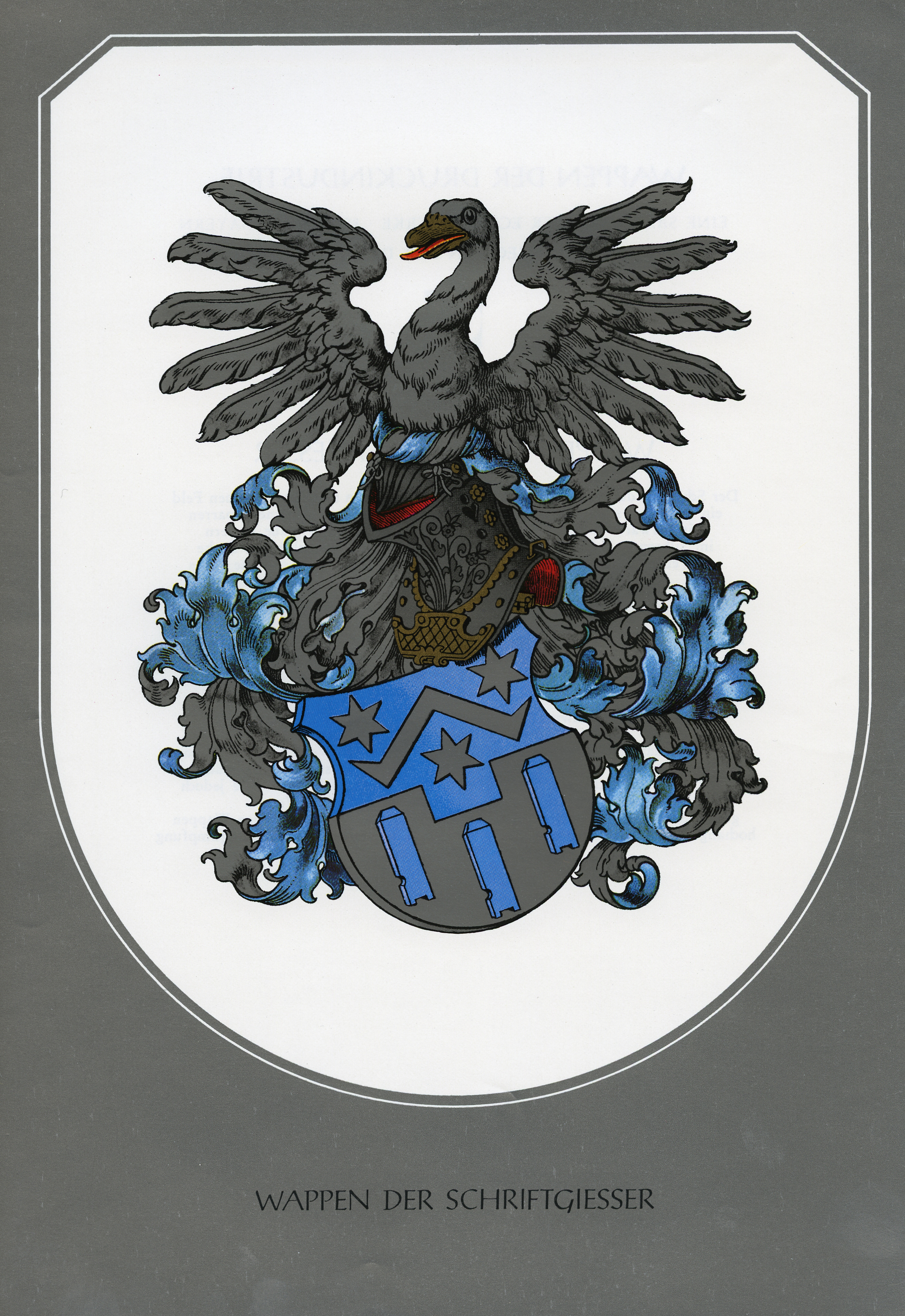
The German coat of arms for a type-founders' guild (or "Schriftgießer" in German)

A type foundry is a company that designs or distributes typefaces. Before digital typography, type foundries manufactured and sold metal and wood typefaces for hand typesetting, and matrices for line-casting machines like the Linotype and Monotype, for letterpress printers. Today's digital type foundries accumulate and distribute typefaces (typically as digitized fonts) created by type designers, who may either be freelancers operating their own independent foundry, or employed by a foundry. Type foundries may also provide custom type design services.

== England ==
In England, type foundries began in 1476, when William Caxton introduced the printing press, importing at least some of the type that he used in printing. Until William Caslon (1692–1766), English type generally had a poor reputation so the best type was imported from Holland.

Only after Caslon had established his Caslon foundry in Chiswell Street, did the City of London become a major centre for the industry, until the end of the 20th century when famous metal-based printing districts such as Fleet Street came to the close of their era. The industry was particularly important in Victorian times, when education became available to all due to the new school boards, and firms such as Charles Reed & Sons, the printer and type founders were in their heyday. The St Bride Printing Library in the City of London encourages wider public interest in the history of type founding for the printed book and newspaper.

== Modern corporations ==
- Apple Inc.
- Google LLC
- Letraset
- Monotype Imaging
  - Ascender Corporation, a subsidiary of Monotype Imaging
  - Bitstream, a subsidiary of Monotype Imaging
  - FontFont, a subsidiary of Monotype Imaging, located in Germany
  - International Typeface Corporation (ITC), a subsidiary of Monotype Imaging
  - Linotype GmbH, a subsidiary of Monotype Imaging, located in Germany
  - URW Type Foundry, a subsidiary of Monotype Imaging, located in Germany
  - Hoefler & Co. (H&Co), a subsidiary of Monotype Imaging, located in New York City

== Large form ==
- Berthold Type Foundry
- Elsner+Flake
- Emigre
- Font Bureau
- House Industries
- Neufville Typefoundry (Fundición Tipográfica Neufville)

== Independent ==
- Blambot
- Chank Diesel
- Comicraft
- Dalton Maag
- Darden Studio
- Larabie Fonts/Typodermic
- Mark Simonson Studio
- Parachute
- P22 Type Foundry
- Sandoll Communications
- Scriptorium Fonts
- Typofonderie / formerly Porchez Typofonderie
- Typotheque

== Defunct ==
- American Type Founders
- Barnhart Brothers & Spindler
- Bauer Type
- Binny & Ronaldson
- Caslon Type Foundry
- Charles Reed & Sons
- Deberny & Peignot
- Grafotechna
- Inland Type Foundry
- Louis Pouchée
- Stephenson Blake
- VEB Typoart
