= Lewis Clephane =

American abolitionist, politician under Lincoln, and civic leader in Washington, D.C.

- Born: March 13, 1824; Washington, D.C.
- Died: February 12, 1897 (aged 72); Washington, D.C.
- Occupations: Postmaster general, publisher of National Republican
- Family: James O. Clephane (brother)

Lewis Clephane was an American politician, businessman, and civic leader in 19th-century Washington, D.C. Clephane was an organizer and co-founder of the Republican Party, early abolitionist, and Postmaster of Washington, D.C., appointed by Abraham Lincoln. Lewis Clephane co-founded the National Republican (newspaper) with his company, Lewis Clephane & Co., serving as publisher. He is known as the "Pioneer Washington Republican" and is best known for his 1889 retrospective address titled "The Birth of the Republican Party." He is part of the Clephane family who were early settlers of Washington, D.C. His younger brother, James O. Clephane, is known as "Father of the Linotype" machine and provided instruction and financial backing to Ottmar Mergenthaler for the invention of the typewriter and similar mass-printing inventions. Lewis Clephane was also a co-founder of the Washington, D.C., arm of The Metropolitan Club.

== Early days ==
Lewis Clephane was born on March 13, 1824, in Northwest Washington, D.C., to James Clephane and Ann Ogilvie. James Clephane was born in Edinburgh, Scotland, in 1790, to a noble family dating back to the Norman Conquest. James Clephane Sr. emigrated to America in 1817, was a printer and typographer who had assisted in setting up the first edition of Sir Walter Scott's Waverley while in Edinburgh, and was for some time the president of the Columbia Typographical Union. The family was prominent in Washington, D.C. high society, particularly post-Civil War during the Gilded Age and into the 20th century.

Clephane attended the Academy of Charles Strahan on Ninth and H Streets Northwest in Washington, D.C., near Judiciary Square where his family was residing. His education was completed by the age of twelve, at which time he began work at a local bookshop, Kennedy & Elliot, which he would be given charge of within the next five years. By the early 1840s, Clephane embarked on his own work as an entrepreneur like much of his family, and forged a connection with The National Era—an abolitionist newspaper in D.C. responsible for the original publication of Uncle Tom's Cabin—at the age of 23. He served as their Business Manager and was a contributor to the paper. Clephane's most notable contribution was his June 19, 1855, publication in organizing the republican party. He worked for the paper until it was discontinued in 1859.

== Family and origins ==
Clephane's family can be traced back to their initial settlement in what is now Scotland shortly after the Norman Conquest. Between 1200 and the Battle of Bannockburn, the Clephanes acquired lands of Castle of Carslogie, which became their primary seat. They constructed the castle in 1590, and the ruins of the castle still bear the date's inscription. The castle was handed through generations until 1804, when Major General William McLean Douglas Clephane sold the castle and barony lands prior to dying. It is now called Carslogie House. Clephane's father, James Clephane, is known to have been close with Sir Walter Scott who was the guardian of Clephane's cousin, Margaret Clephane. She would go on to marry Spencer Compton and become the second Marquess of Northampton.

James Clephane Sr. emigrated to America in 1817, and subsequently moved to what is now Judiciary Square in Washington, D.C.; He was a printer and typographer who had assisted in printing the first edition of Sir Walter Scott's Waverley while in Edinburgh. He was for some time the president of the Columbia Typographical Union.

James O. Clephane, Lewis's younger brother, is a notable inventor of the Linotype machine and venture capitalist who was to be a superb typist, working as a stenographer for high courts in Washington, D.C., and in Abraham Lincoln's cabinet.

== Involvement in politics and organization of Republican Party ==
Clephane was a member of the Wide Awakes—an early Republican organization composed mainly of younger citizens across the country who catalyzed the rise of their political views as a third party. A main pillar was abolitionism, and in the absence of its possibility, containment of slavery to the south. The group was regarded as secretive and at times similar to a secret society, dawned in black robes and hats with carrying torches to maintain anonymity.

Lewis Clephane's efforts as a Wide Awake in promoting Republican candidates—namely Abraham Lincoln—as mainstream options for office resulted in his prominence in the Republican Party in Washington, D.C., once it was a more recognized political organization.

While working for The National Era in June 1855, Clephane published a brochure titled "The Birth of the Republican Party" calling for the formal convention of a national republican party, of which he and four other men organized. Article V of the text, which was delivered in an address as well, calls for the abolition of slavery in the United States and its territories. The party quickly gained traction, but due to its unpopularity in Washington, D.C.'s southern-dominated politics of the time, members of the party were not made public. A note at the margin of Clephane's address that was signed by the members reads: "In signing this constitution I do hereby promise not to divulge the names of its members."

Francis Preston Blair Jr. was elected the first president of the first Republican National Convention on June 17, 1856, in Philadelphia, Pennsylvania, and Clephane served on the executive board and represented Washington, D.C. Literature for the convention, involving abolitionist dialogue, was disseminated largely through Clephane's connections and role at The National Era. The first candidate the convention put up for election, Fremont, was defeated, but four years later the convention put forth Abraham Lincoln, who became the 16th President of the United States until his assassination in 1865. At the time of Lincoln's election, Clephane was serving as the national president of the Wide Awakes while living in Washington, D.C. The headquarters was attacked by pro-slavery rioters during a meeting in 1860, in which they ransacked the building in attempts to kill the abolitionist group. Clephane and others remained in the building, fleeing to the third floor and then, upon a fire being set inside, to the roof at which time the rioters fled. Reportedly, Clephane had picked up a brick off the chimney while on the roof and was preparing to defend his group against the rebels, according to a 1918 address by his son to the D.C. Historical society.

When the newly-formed Republican Party's Abraham Lincoln won the 1860 election, Clephane served on the inaugural committee for the 1861 inauguration. Clephane then changed the name of the newspaper from National Era to the National Republican. He served as director and his company, Lewis Clephane & Co., was its publisher.

== Appointment to Postmaster of Washington, D.C. ==
On May 10, 1861, Clephane was appointed to Postmaster of Washington, D.C., by President Lincoln in exchange for his extensive service in prior years to the President and now-formed Republican Party. At the time, Postmaster of the District of Columbia was a critical role, as the U.S. Army's mail was routed and dispatched through Washington, making it a position with crucial responsibilities. In a letter from the day Clephane was appointed, Lincoln writes to his Treasury Secretary Chase of the controversy that he is naming Clephane over Nathan Sargent, a longtime colleague of Lincoln's -- a decision that caused much debate.

== Post-1865 civic involvement ==
Upon Lincoln's second victorious election, a "Lincoln and Johnson Organization" was formed, of which Clephane was elected president. Lewis Clephane was also elected the first Republican member of the Board of Alderman of Washington, D.C. His work resulted in the passage of the District of Columbia Organic Act of 1871 that formally established D.C,'s municipal government.

From January 1, 1869, to August 1871, Clephane served as receiver of the Washington, Alexandria & Mount Vernon Railway. In December 1873, he was appointed collector of taxes for D.C.

== Roles in banking and other institutions ==
In 1874 after his role as collector of taxes, Clephane became involved in banking and financial institutions, serving as director of Second National Bank and National Savings and Trust Company. He also served as president of the Metropolitan Railroad and various industrial material manufacturers. Clephane assisted, too, in forming the National Homeopathic Hospital.

== Construction of the Clephane Mansion in Washington, D.C. ==
In 1877, Lewis Clephane built a residence on the northeast corner of 13th and K Streets Northwest in Downtown (Washington, D.C.) designed by J. Fraser, architect for the United States Department of the Treasury and Blaine Mansion (DC). The residence was designed in the Second Empire architectural style and adhered to the architecture already present around the property as well as similar Italianate structures that would be installed afterwards. K Street was one of the city's most high-profile residential locations and was viewed as the center of social and societal activity. Clephane often held large events at the residence for both personal and political purposes whose guest lists included notable military figures, senators, fellow cabinet members, his brother and family James O. Clephane, and societal leaders. By the late 19th century and was home to many Supreme Court justices, politicians, Generals, and other members of Washington, D.C., High society. Directly across from Franklin Square, the stretch of K Street NW was referred to as Franklin's Row or Mansions Row, known for its high concentration of elegant homes and mansions. The home was featured in the American Architect and Building News on September 7, 1878.

Clephane lived at the mansion until his death from pneumonia at the age of 72 on February 12, 1897. He is buried in Glenwood Cemetery (Washington, D.C.), whose board of trustees he sat on for a number of years.

The mansions along Franklin's Row were all demolished by the mid-1930s. The only remaining structure from the area's original buildings is the Planet Word building that was directly across the street from the Clephane home.
