= Mergenthaler Linotype Company =

Typesetting equipment manufacturer

- Type: Subsidiary
- Founded: 1886; 140 years ago
- Defunct: 2013
- Headquarters: New York
- Products: Linotype machine

The Mergenthaler Linotype Company was a company founded in the United States in 1886 to market the Linotype machine (/ˈlaɪnəˌtaɪp, -noʊ-/), a system to cast metal type in lines (linecaster) invented by Ottmar Mergenthaler. It became the world's leading manufacturer of newspaper and book typesetting equipment. Its main competitor was the American Intertype Corporation and the British-American Monotype Corporation.

Starting in the late 1950s, the Mergenthaler Linotype Company became a major supplier of phototypesetting equipment which included laser typesetters, raster image processors, scanners, and typesetting computers.

In 1987, the US-based Mergenthaler Linotype Company became part of the German Linotype-Hell AG; in the US the company name changed to Linotype Co. In 1996, the German Linotype-Hell AG was taken over by the German printing machine company Heidelberger Druckmaschinen AG. A separate business, Linotype Library GmbH was established to manage the digital assets (mainly fonts).

In 2005, Linotype Library GmbH shortened its name to Linotype GmbH, and in 2006, Linotype GmbH was acquired by Monotype Imaging Holdings, Inc., the parent of Monotype Imaging, Inc. and others. In 2013, Linotype GmbH officially ends when it is renamed Monotype GmbH. In August 2023, Monotype announced that it was discontinuing Linotype.com, effectively closing the business.

== Founding ==
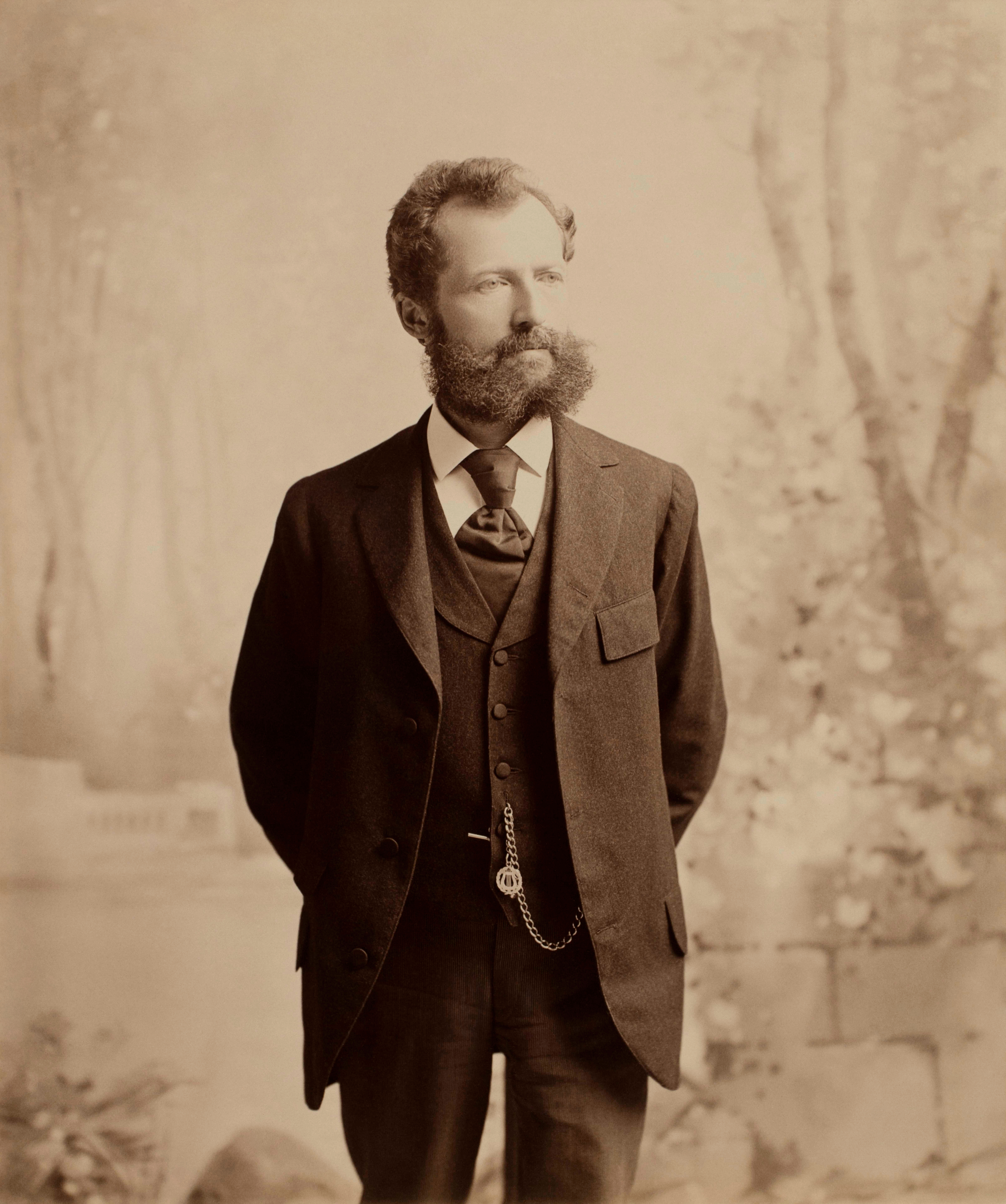
Ottmar Mergenthaler, inventor of the linotype machine and company founder

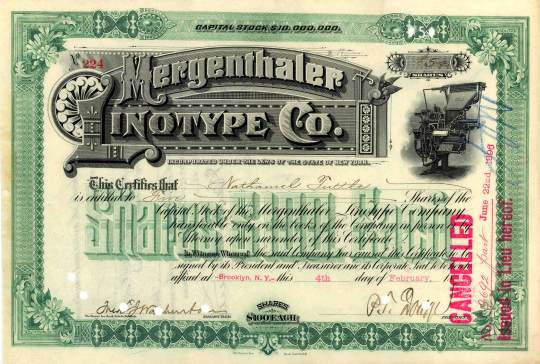
An 1896 Mergenthaler Linotype stock certificate

The invention of a machine to replace the labor-intensive task of setting type by hand had been tackled by many inventors during the 19th century. The most time consumed was not in creating the text, but in returning the characters to their proper position for future use. Ottmar Mergenthaler solved this problem by placing a type mold for a letter on the side of a specially keyed matrix (with multiple matrix/molds available for any given letter). The linotype operator would type in a line of text. The machine would drop each matrix with its mold into place, assembling the matrices into a line of text that was needed. Hot lead alloy was then forced into the molds of matrices, creating the fresh line of type.

The linotype operator would then go on to type in the next line. Multiple lines would be stacked into blocks, sometimes paragraphs, to be set in place in the proper column of the page layout. Meanwhile, back inside the linotype machine, the matrices used for a line would progress through the machine, where the special keying system on one end of the matrix, unique for each character, would allow the matrix to drop back only into the correct storage slot, ready for the next use. Another benefit of this overall process was that each edition of the paper was created from a fresh casting of metal, thus avoiding problems of type wear.

Another problem Mergenthaler solved was in justifying the type, or ensuring that in a column of print, there were flush margins on the left and right. Hand compositors had previously done this by inserting spaces of different widths between words in a line, to ensure that the lines all aligned. Mergenthaler adapted the “spaceband” (patent awarded to J. W. Schuckers), a device consisting of two opposing wedges of connected metal which expand when pushed in opposite directions. When a line of type was being justified, all the spaceband wedges would be pushed up by the justification-slide block to spread the line out to the full measure (all the way to the left and right width) being cast. The spacebands were stored for reuse in the spaceband box; a different location from the matrices (which were stored in the magazin).

== History ==
The invention of the first working Linotype was a long process that involved many players and the creation of a succession of companies.

In 1877, the National Printing Company was organized under the laws of the District of Columbia and Lewis Clephane, the brother of James O. Clephane, was elected president. After the first successful trial of the Linotype in October, 1885, the Mergenthaler Printing Company was established to raise fresh capital from the shareholders of the National Printing Company. Finally, The Mergenthaler Linotype Company was formed in New York in 1895. Philip Tell Dodge served as its first president until 1928 when his son Norman Dodge replaced him. The Mergenthaler Linotype Company of New York, the organization's newest iteration, was launched with $5,000,000 capital (in 1895 dollars, $198,226,190.48 in 2026) and $10,000,000 (in 1895 dollars, $396,452,380.95 in 2026)in stock holdings across 333 investors.

In 1889 The Linotype Company, a British offshoot of the firm, was formed by Joseph Lawrence, publisher of The Railway Magazine. In 1899, a new factory in Broadheath, Altrincham was opened. In 1903, the British company merged with Machinery Trust to form Linotype & Machinery Ltd.

Mergenthaler Linotype dominated the printing industry through the twentieth century. The machines were so well designed, major parts remained virtually unchanged for nearly 100 years. A particularly notable success was Linotype's Legibility Group of typefaces, used by most of the world's (Latin-alphabet) newspapers for much of the twentieth century. The ruggedness of the Linotype system, which cast lines as solid bars of type, aided this dominance.

In 1969 Linotype Company was merged with Mergenthaler acquisition K. S. Paul to form Linotype-Paul Ltd which developed a range of Linotron phototypesetters using K. S. Paul's cathode ray tube technology.

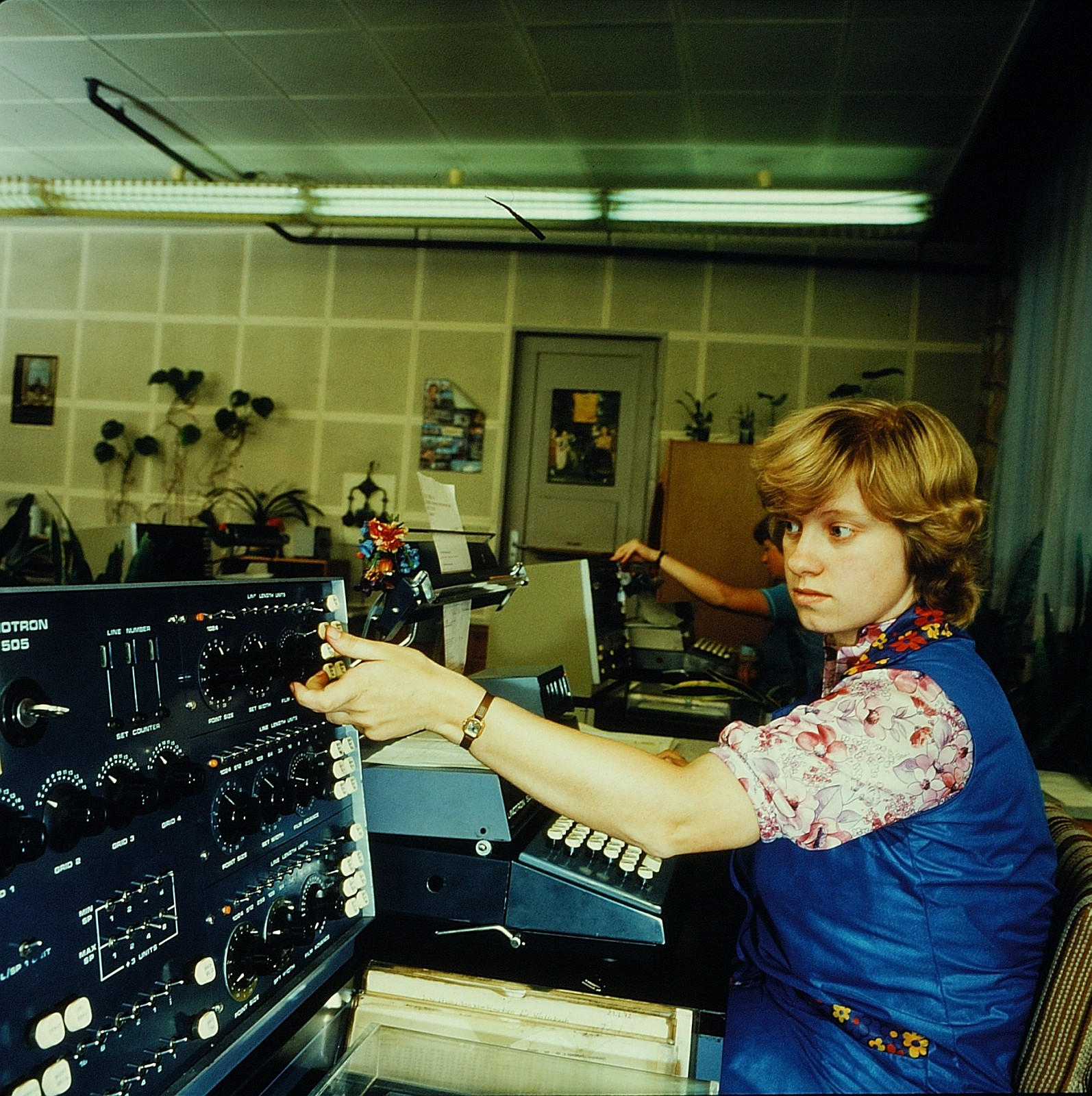
A woman operates a Linotron 505, a cathode ray tube phototypesetting machine. Dresden, 1983.

The company, as so many in the printing industry, endured a complex post-war history, during which printing technology went through two revolutions — first moving to phototypesetting, then to digital.

During the 1950s, the Davidson Corporation, which manufactured a series of small offset presses, was a subsidiary of Linotype. This was later sold to American Type Founders and operated under the name ATF-Davidson.

Through a series of mergers and reorganizations, the business of Mergenthaler Linotype Company ultimately vested in Linotype-Hell AG, a German company. In April 1997, Linotype-Hell AG was acquired by Heidelberger Druckmaschinen AG. The following month certain divisions of Linotype-Hell AG were spun off into new companies, one of which was Linotype Library GmbH with headquarters at Bad Homburg vor der Höhe. This new company was responsible solely for the acquisition, creation and distribution of digital fonts and related software. This spin-off effectively divorced the company's font software business from the older typesetting business which was retained by Heidelberg.

In 2005, Linotype Library GmbH shortened its name to Linotype GmbH, and in 2007, Linotype GmbH was acquired by Monotype Imaging Holdings, Inc., the parent of Monotype Imaging, Inc. and others.

In August 2023, Monotype announced that it would be closing the Linotype e-commerce platform, together with FontShop and Fonts.com. Monotype stated that it could no longer maintain its desired level of quality across the platforms and would instead be focussing its efforts on developing its MyFonts site. The company pledged to preserve Linotype’s history and legacy online with stories and content.

== Typefaces ==
The typefaces in the Linotype type library are the artwork of some of the most famous typeface designers of the 20th century. The library contains such famous trademarked typefaces as Palatino and Optima by Hermann Zapf; Frutiger, Avenir and Univers by Adrian Frutiger; and Helvetica by Max Miedinger and Eduard Hoffman. Linotype GmbH frequently brings out new designs from both established and new type designers. Linotype had also introduced FontExplorer X for Mac OS X. It was a well-reviewed font manager that allows users to browse and purchase new fonts within the program — a business model similar to that used by iTunes and the iTunes Store.

The Arabic typeface Simplified Arabic, later called Yakout for the 13th-century Islamic calligrapher Yaqut al-Musta'simi, was released by Linotype in 1956, and remains one of the most common Arabic typefaces for books and newspapers.

== See also ==
- Hot-metal typesetting
- Chauncey Hawley Griffith
- Women in Type

== Sources ==
- Romano, Frank (2014). History of the Linotype Company. RIT Press. ISBN 978-1-933360-60-7. Project MUSE book 33719.
- Romano, Frank (2014). "Mackey's 1936 History of the Linotype Company". History of the Linotype Company. RIT Press. pp. 49–74. ISBN 978-1-933360-75-1. Project MUSE chapter 1314659.
