= James O. Clephane =

American businessman and politician

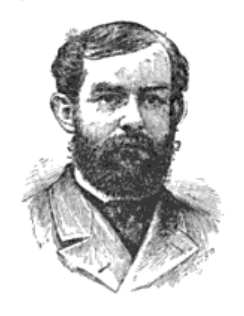
- Born: February 21, 1842; Washington, D.C., US
- Died: November 30, 1910 (aged 68); Englewood, New Jersey, US
- Occupations: Inventor, politician, court reporter, venture capitalist
- Spouse: Pauline Medina Harrison (m. 1867)
- Children: Sarah Levina Clephane; Malcolm Walcott Clephane; Mrs. Peter Stanford Duryee (Pauline Clephane)
- Parent(s): James Clephane and Anne Ogilvie
- Relatives: Lewis Clephane (sibling)

James Ogilvie Clephane (February 21, 1842 – November 30, 1910) was an American inventor, bar-admitted stenographer who served in Abraham Lincoln's cabinet, private secretary to Secretary of State William Seward, and venture capitalist in both Washington, D.C., and New York City. James O. Clephane led the funeral procession of his friend and employer, President Abraham Lincoln, down Pennsylvania Avenue as a civic marshal, and was followed by "three hundred marshals and assistant marshals, eleven Major-Generals, eighty-four Brigadier-Generals, twelve hundred other military officers, one hundred and fifty naval officers including Vice Admiral Farragut, and one hundred and eight Senators and members of Congress. In the procession were eighteen thousand. The witnesses were estimated at one hundred and fifty thousand."

Clephane was involved in improving, promoting and supporting several inventions during the Gilded Age, including the typewriter, the graphophone, and the linotype machine. He has been called the "father of the linotype machine", and the development of mechanical typesetting, including the first typewriter, was largely due to his initiative and investment. He is known as the "unsung hero of the development of the typewriter and Linotype."

== Early days ==
James O. Clephane was born in Washington, D.C., to James Clephane and Ann Ogilvie in 1842. His father, James Clephane, was born in Edinburgh, Scotland in 1790, to a noble family dating back to the Norman Conquest. James Clephane Sr. emigrated to America in 1817, was a printer and typographer who had assisted in setting up the first edition of Sir Walter Scott's Waverley while in Edinburgh, and was for some time the president of the Columbia Typographical union. James O. Clephane's older brother, Lewis Clephane, served as the D.C. postmaster general—selected by his confidant and President Abraham Lincoln. The family was prominent in Washington, D.C., high society post-Civil War, during the Gilded Age, and into the 20th century.

James O. Clephane was a highly competent shorthand writer and developer of early shorthand writing systems. His exceptional ability brought him early in contact with such men as President James Buchanan and President Abraham Lincoln, who became his personal friends. He was the private secretary (the precursor to a chief of staff) to United States Secretary of State William H. Seward, and was then admitted to the bar of the Supreme Court in the District of Columbia, where his duties were chiefly that of a stenographer. He was "one of the leading stenographers during the eventful days of the civil war and subsequently". He was called to testify at the trial of Andrew Johnson.

On April 3, 1868, Clephane testified in the impeachment trial of President Andrew Johnson, having been called as a witness by the prosecution. He was one of several individuals who testified about a speech that Johnson had made in Washington, D.C., on August 18, 1866. Clephane had, at the time of the speech, made a report on it as a phonographic reporter. Along with the other witnesses, he corroborated that the wording of their reports had been corrected by the president's private secretary, Colonel W. G. Moore. Moore then testified that the corrections made by him were corrections he had made without the approval of Johnson, and only related to the language used, and did not change the sense of the reports.

While a court reporter, he began to seek easier ways to transcribe his notes and legal briefs quickly and produce multiple copies, as was required. Thus he was enthusiastic when the typewriter was successfully completed and commercialized by his colleagues and business associate Christopher Sholes.

Clephane would eventually move his family from their downtown Washington, D.C., residence to a substantial home in Englewood, New Jersey—a popular New York City suburb for financiers during the late 19th century. His work as a venture capitalist would continue at his office on Wall Street at 45 Broadway, New York, New York.

== Typewriter ==
There were many patents for "writing machines" throughout the 19th century, but the only one to become commercially successful was the typewriter invented by Christopher Sholes, along with Soule and Glidden. Clephane had an indirect but important part to play in its development and perfection.

When Sholes and his business associate James Densmore began to pursue commercial development of their machine, they realized that stenographers would be among the first and most important users, and sent experimental versions to many stenographers, one of whom was Clephane. The pair had tried previously to develop a "writing machine" as they were called, and asked Clephane for financial backing for the venture. Clephane, in turn, tried out each of the models of what would become the typewriter. Clephane subjected them to such unsparing tests that he destroyed them, one after another, as fast as they could be made and sent to him. His judgements were similarly caustic, causing Sholes to lose his patience and temper.

Said he to Densmore: "I am through with Clephane!" Densmore's comment was: "This candid fault-finding is just what we need. We had better have it now than after we begin manufacturing. Where Clephane points out a weak lever or rod let us make it strong. Where a spacer or an inker works stiffly, let us make it work smoothly. Then, depend upon Clephane for all the praise we deserve."

Sholes took this advice and improved the machine at every iteration, until they were satisfied that Clephane had taught them everything he could. The first seven typewriters ever sold were built for Clephane's own employees. The historian George Iles identified this fact that "it had been developed under the fire of an unrelenting critic" as one of the circumstances that distinguished the Sholes typewriter. Clephane's contribution has also been used as an example for Eric von Hippel's recommendation that manufacturers work with lead users in developing their product.

== Mechanical typesetting ==
Although the typewriter would go into commercial production only in 1873, Clephane recognised that it would solve part of his problems, as notes could now be transcribed quickly, but it would still take long to typeset the material and prepare it for publication. "I want to bridge the gap between the typewriter and the printed page" he declared in 1872, and began to pursue the invention of a machine for typesetting. Along with Charles T. Moore, he devised a machine which cast type from papier-mâché matrices indented by mechanically assembled characters, but it had numerous defects which they were unable to rectify. Moore approached August Hahl in 1876, with whom Ottmar Mergenthaler was working at the time. Mergenthaler immediately suggested casting the type from a metal matrix instead, and set to work on a typesetting machine, spending a year redesigning it until in the summer of 1877 he felt he had a working prototype.

It produced print by lithography, which was problematic. Clephane made the suggestion of using stereography instead, and Mergenthaler began to research this approach, for which Clephane provided financial backing. By 1879, it was still in development. Mergenthaler designed a line casting machine, but then tore up the plans in frustration. Clephane encouraged him to continue; he remained confident in the value of the invention despite all the scepticism and financial embarrassments that accompanied it.

By 1883, the machine was perfected and patented in 1884. Meanwhile, Clephane had formed the National Typographic Company for manufacturing it, with a capitalization of $1 million and named Mergenthaler as manager of its Baltimore factory. The company became the Mergenthaler Printing Company in 1885. It had its first "commercial demonstration" on July 3, 1886, before Whitelaw Reid of the New York Tribune, who exclaimed "Ottmar, you've done it again! A line o' type!" from which it got its name: the Linotype machine.

Clephane remained a Director of Mergenthaler Linotype Company until October 1910 when he was succeeded by Norman Dodge.

== Family History and Reputation ==
The Clephane family was prominent among elites in Washington, D.C. James O. Clephane's brother —Lewis Clephane—was named Postmaster of District by Abraham Lincoln, tapped for a senior role at the United States Department of the Treasury by Salmon P. Chase, and occupied an influential role in Washington's high political society. James O. Clephane and Lewis maintained close relations with President Lincoln and his family. Lewis Clephane is also credited with founding the Republican Party and early abolitionist efforts amid majority pro-slavery elites in Washington. Further, Lewis Clephane went on to be the publisher of pro-Lincoln newspaper, The National Republican (newspaper). He would eventually build a mansion at the corner of 13th Street Northwest and K Street (Washington, D.C.) Northwest.

The Clephane family can be traced back to the family's noble roots, with their initial settlement in what is now Scotland directly after the Norman Conquest. Between 1200 and the Battle of Bannockburn, the Clephanes acquired lands of Castle of Carslogie, which became their primary seat. They constructed the castle in 1590, and the ruins of the castle still bear the date's inscription. The castle was handed through generations until 1804, when Major General William McLean Douglas Clephane sold the castle and barony lands prior to dying. It is now called Carslogie House.

James Ogilvie Clephane's father, James Clephane Sr., is known to have been close with Sir Walter Scott who was the guardian of Clephane's cousin, Margaret Clephane. She would go on to marry Spencer Compton and become the second Marquess of Northampton.

James Clephane Sr. emigrated to America in 1817, and subsequently moved to what is now Judiciary Square in Washington, D.C.; He was a printer and typographer who had assisted in printing the first edition of Sir Walter Scott's Waverley while in Edinburgh. He was for some time the president of the Columbia Typographical union. Clephane Sr. was a member of the Original Inhabitants of Washington D.C., an elite group of original men with deep societal and political ties for generations in the nation's capital.

James O. Clephane was known to be a superb typist, and worked as a stenographer for high courts in Washington, D.C., as well as in Abraham Lincoln's cabinet. He would also go on to pass the Bar examination, but would remain a stenographer despite earning a law degree. It was in his work with courts and the President that Clephane discovered the inefficiencies of type-writing, specifically the tediousness of duplicating transcripts, as was required.

J.O. Clephane served as the lead civic marshal in the procession through Washington, D.C. following Assassination of Abraham Lincoln alongside Col. B. B. French. The procession had an estimated 18,000 participants and 150,000 spectators.

Lewis Clephane would remain in Washington, D.C., as a key figure in the city's upper echelon, and becoming a co-founder of Metropolitan Club of Washington, D.C. His son, Walter Clephane, would remain prominent and lived in Chevy Chase (Washington, D.C.).

In the late 19th century, James Ogilvie Clephane relocated to the New York metropolitan area, seeing great success in his financier work following the successful inventions from years prior and directorships in subsequent mechanical printing companies, such as Mergenthaler Linotype Company of New York, New Jersey, West Virginia, and other iterations that had paid its stockholders and founders dividends over a three-year period of over US$119,000,000 (in 2023 dollars). His family moved to an estate in Englewood, New Jersey and are consistently listed in the Social Register throughout the 19th and 20th century, as was Lewis Clephane's family in Washington, D.C.

== Other ==
Besides the typewriter and the linotype machine, he was also involved in the development of the graphophone and served on the board of directors of Columbia Records, making "one of the leading phonographers of the country". In addition, he was also a director in the Locke Steel Belt Company, the Linomatrix Machine Company, the National Typographic Company, the Aurora Mining Company, the Horton Basket Machine Company, the Fowler-Henkle Printing Press Company, the Oddur Machine Company, in several of which he was the president. He also published some travel literature.

His role in surprisingly many inventions is explained by Roger Burlingame:

Clephane [...] was intent upon his problem. He was constantly stretching out his antennae for new ideas. It is not surprising that such a man should provide a center for gadget-fanciers. It is more so that this center, once established, became such a magnet for investors. Perhaps it was the great idea which drew the support. There was much, to be sure, in the persuasive personality of Clephane—a personality to which Mr. Dale Carnegie might well point. But all the subterfuges practiced today in the winning of friends and the influencing of people would have availed Clephane little without his dynamic, irrepressible faith. He had a kind of Napoleonic power that seemed to go with his little stature. Men flocked about him and he led them forward toward the avatar. If any faltered, Clephane would kick him back on his feet. He was harsh, merciless, dominant when the idea was before him.

He suffered a stroke on Thanksgiving Day (November 24) in 1910, and died six days later. He was living in Englewood, New Jersey, at the time. His widow Pauline Medina Clephane died aged 87 in 1935, leaving two daughters: Pauline Duryee (née Clephane) and Sarah "Sadie" Clephane, and a son: Malcolm Walcott Clephane.
