= Ottmar Mergenthaler =

German-American inventor (1854–1899)

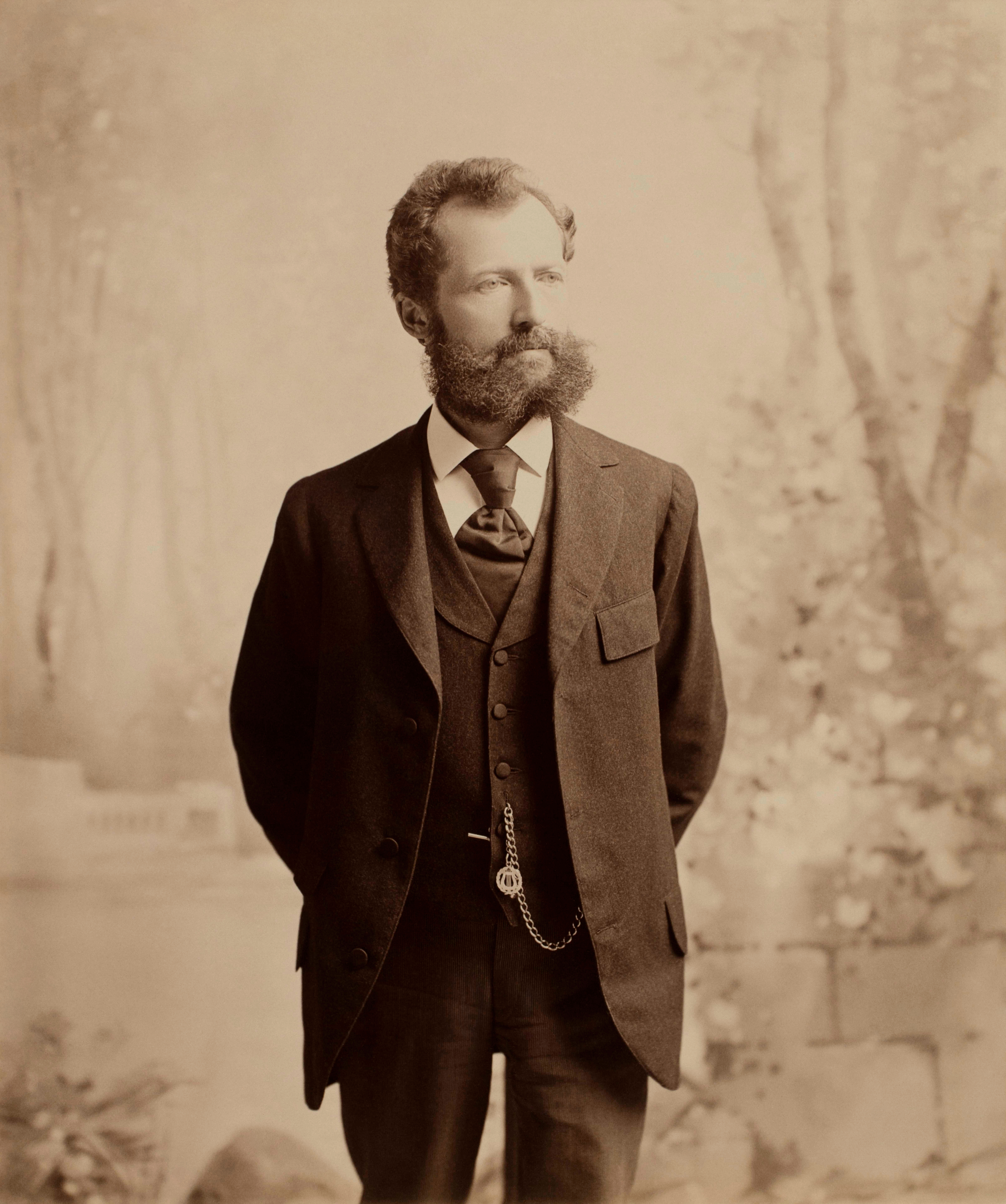
- Ottmar Mergenthaler
- Born: 11 May 1854; Hachtel, Kingdom of Württemberg
- Died: 28 October 1899 (aged 45); Baltimore, Maryland, US
- Occupation: Inventor
- Known for: Linotype
- Height: 5 ft 9 in (175 cm)
- Awards: Elliott Cresson Medal (1889); John Scott Medal (1891)

Signature
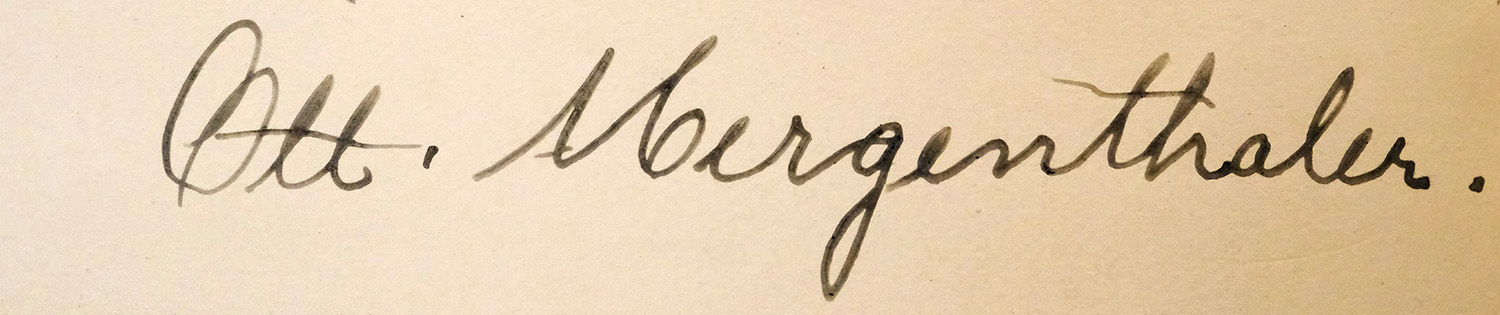

Ottmar Mergenthaler (11 May 1854 – 28 October 1899) was a German-American inventor who invented the linotype machine, the first device that could easily and quickly set complete lines of type for use in printing presses. This machine revolutionized the art of printing.

== Life and career ==
Mergenthaler was born into a German family in Hachtel, Kingdom of Württemberg. He was the third son of a school teacher, Johann Georg Mergenthaler, from Hohenacker near the city of Waiblingen.

He was apprenticed to a watchmaker in Bietigheim before immigrating to the United States in 1872 to work with his cousin August Hahl in Washington, D.C. Mergenthaler eventually moved with Hahl's shop to Baltimore, Maryland. In 1878, Mergenthaler became a naturalized citizen of the United States. In 1881, Mergenthaler became Hahl's business partner.

=== Invention of the Linotype ===
In 1876, Mergenthaler was approached by James O. Clephane and his associate Charles T. Moore, who sought a quicker way of publishing legal briefs. By 1884 he conceived the idea of assembling metallic letter molds, called matrices, and casting molten metal into them, all within a single machine. His first attempt proved the idea feasible, and a new company was formed. Always improving his invention, Mergenthaler further developed his idea of an independent matrix machine.

In July 1886, the first commercially used Linotype was installed in the printing office of the New York Tribune. Here it was immediately used on the daily paper and a large book. The book, the first ever composed with the new Linotype method, was titled, The Tribune Book of Open-Air Sports. Produced by his Mergenthaler Linotype Company, the machine remained a mainstay of the publishing industry until the 1980s.

=== Death ===
Mergenthaler died of pulmonary consumption (tuberculosis) and Asthenia (defined as "loss of vital forces") in Baltimore in 1899.

== Legacy ==
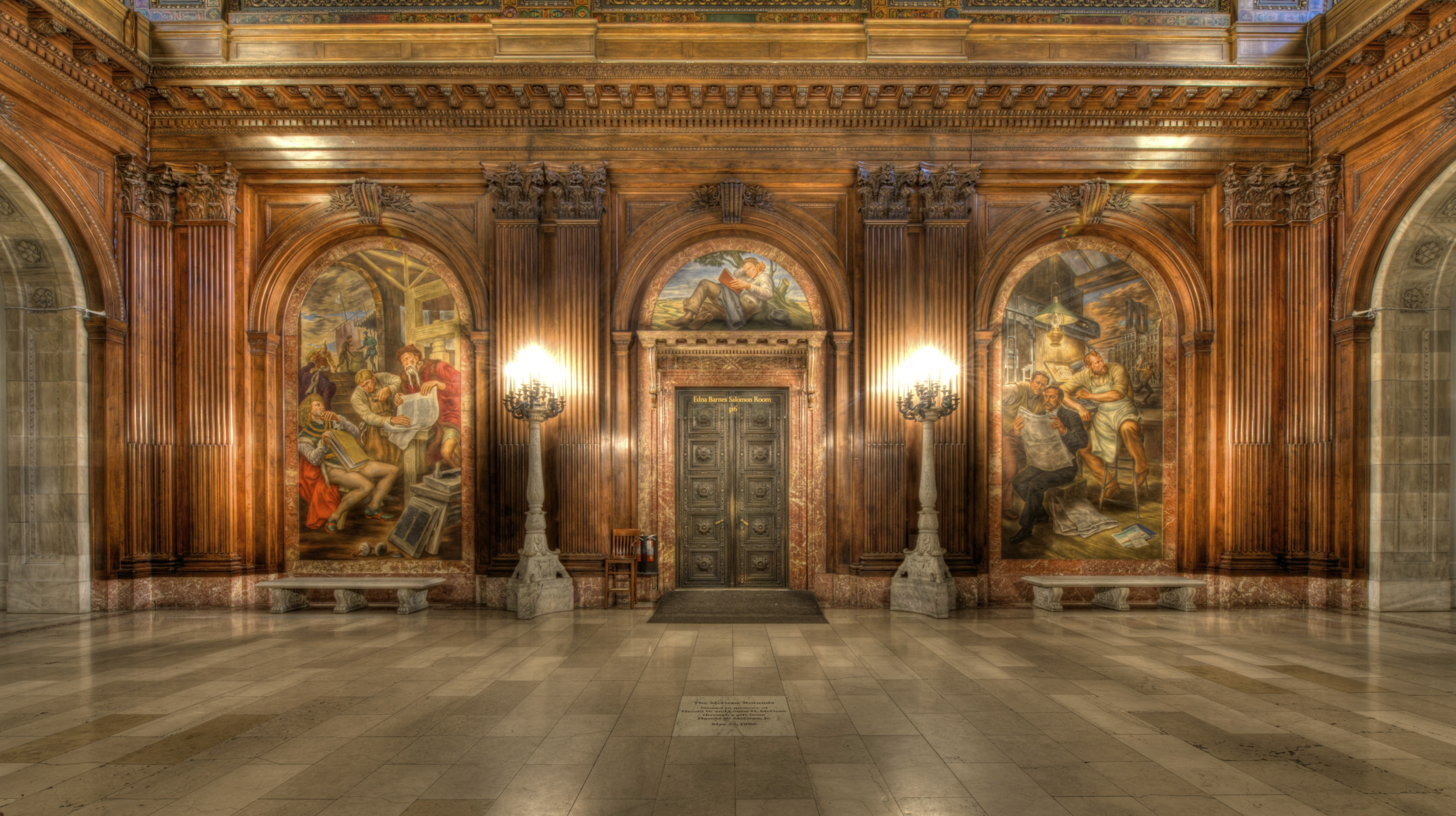
The east wall of the McGraw Rotunda at the New York Public Library Main Branch

An operational Linotype machine is on display at the Baltimore Museum of Industry, in the museum's print shop. Baltimore's vocational high school, Mergenthaler Vocational Technical Senior High School, which opened in 1953, is named after him, although it is commonly referred to simply as "MERVO".

Mergenthaler Hall on the Homewood Campus of the Johns Hopkins University was constructed in 1940–41 with donations by Mergenthaler's widow and his son Eugene.

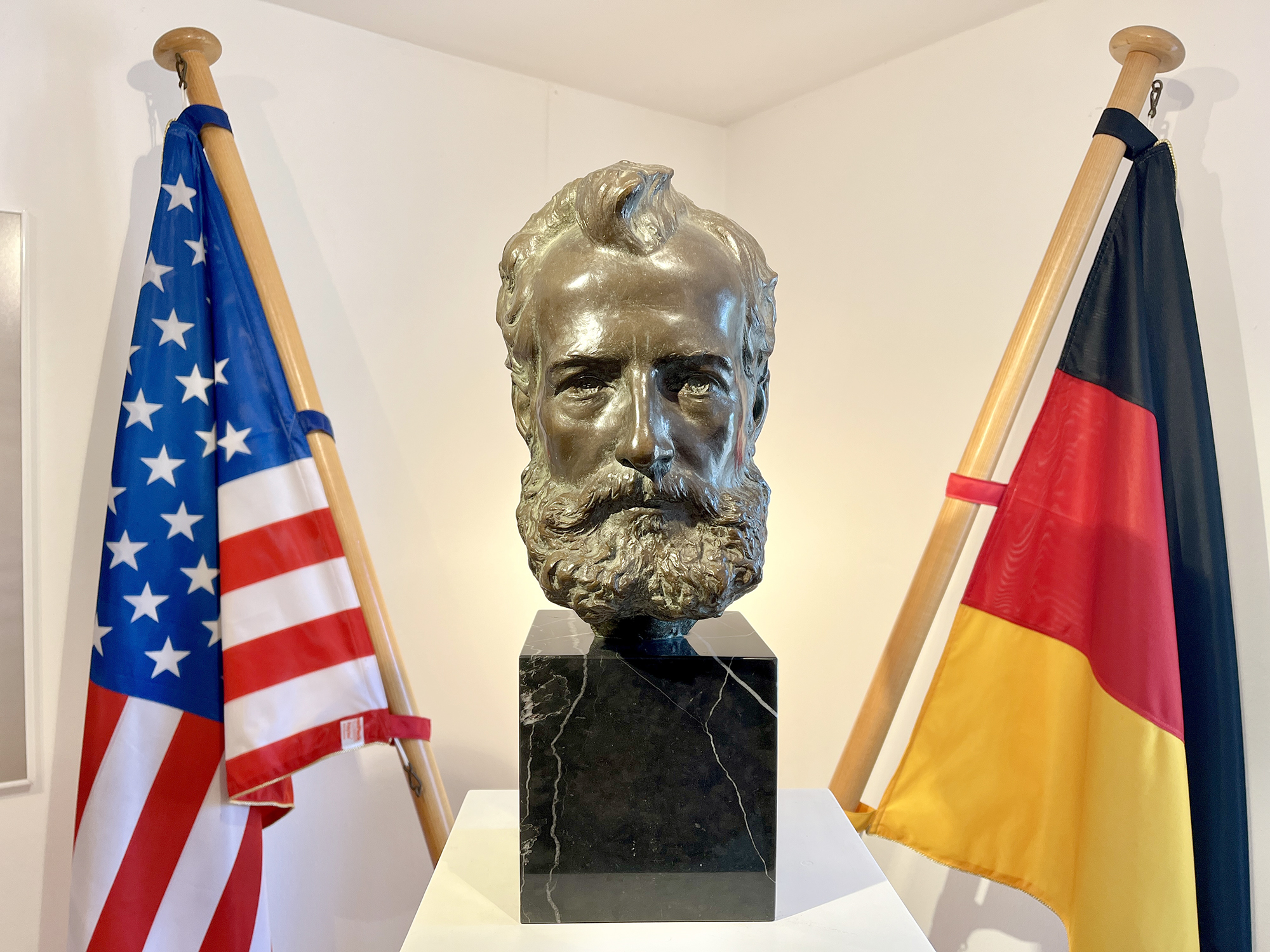
Bronze bust of Ottmar Mergenthaler at his birthplace museum in Hachtel, Germany

Mergenthaler is depicted in Edward Laning's mural The Story of the Recorded Word on the east wall of the McGraw Rotunda at the Main Branch of the New York Public Library. Mergenthaler is shown in the mural alongside his linotype machine and Whitelaw Reid of the New York Tribune.

The Ottmar Mergenthaler Museum is located in his birthplace, Hachtel, Germany. Today, the museum hosts guest to view their working Linotype machine on the ground level with artifacts of Ottmar Mergenthaler's life and invention on the second level.

== See also ==
- List of German inventors and discoverers
