= Linotype machine =

Hot metal typesetting machine (1886–1980s)

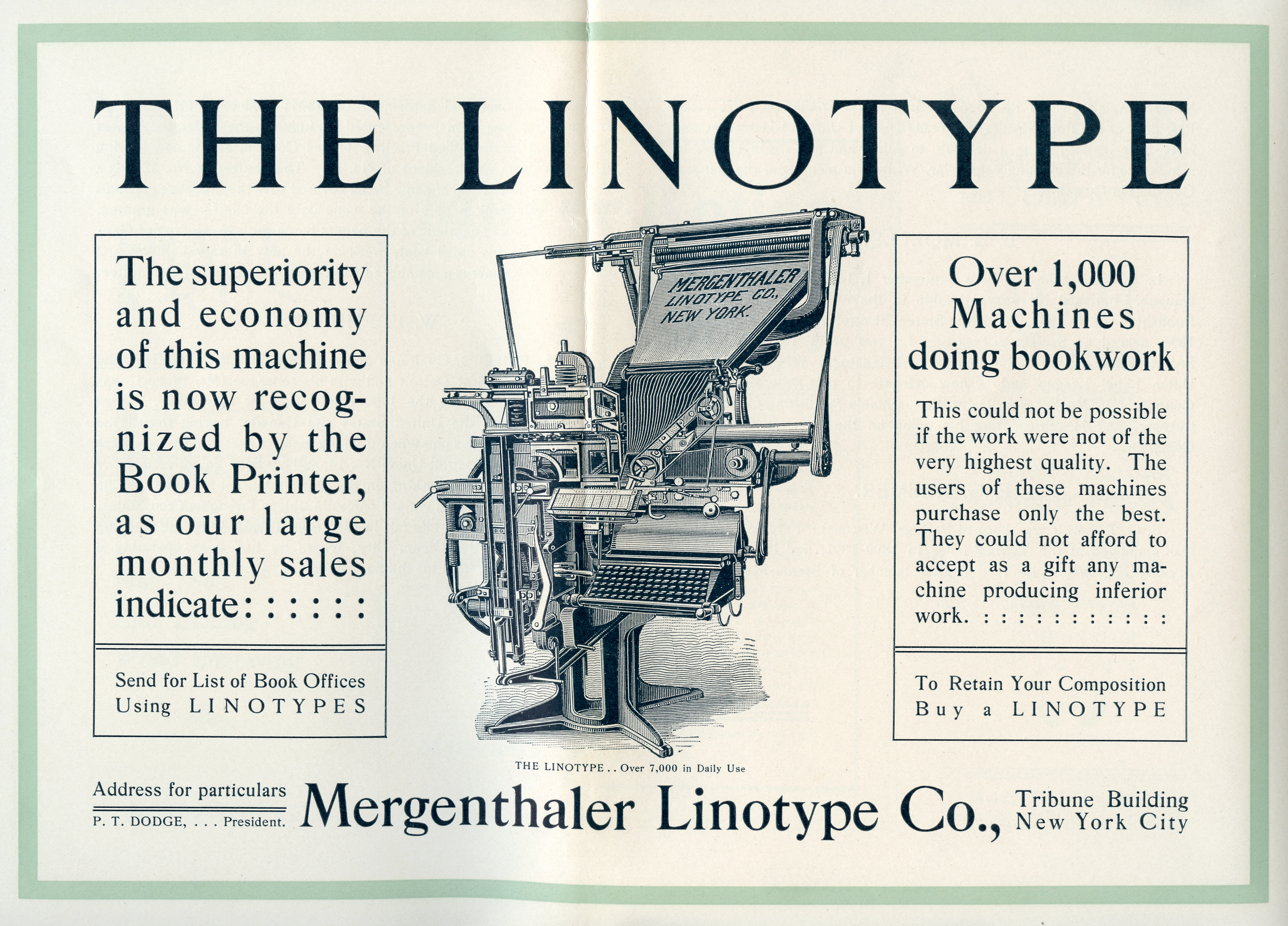
Advertisement for Mergenthaler Linotype Company from 1900. The Linotype became the most popular typecasting machine in the world.

The Linotype machine (/ˈlaɪnəˌtaɪp/ LY-nə-type) is a "line casting" machine used in printing which is manufactured and sold by the former Mergenthaler Linotype Company and related companies. It was a hot metal typesetting system that cast lines of metal type. Linotype became one of the mainstays for typesetting, especially small-size body text for newspapers, magazines, and advertisements from the late 19th century to the 1970s and 1980s, when it was largely replaced by phototypesetting and then digital typesetting.

The name of the machine comes from producing an entire line of metal type at once, hence a line-o’-type. It was a significant improvement over the previous industry standard of letter-by-letter manual hand composition using a composing stick and shallow subdivided trays, called “cases”.

The Linotype machine operator types text on a 90-character keyboard. The machine assembles matrices, or molds of the letter forms, in a line. The assembled line is then sent to the casting part of the machine where it is cast as a single piece, called a slug, from molten type metal in a process known as hot metal typesetting. The matrices are then returned to the type magazine via a distribution bar, to be reused continuously.

The Linotype allows for three to five times faster composition of text when compared with hand composition. It revolutionized typesetting and with it newspaper publishing; making it possible for a relatively small number of operators to set enough type for a multi-page, daily newspaper, even in the smallest towns. Ottmar Mergenthaler invented the Linotype in 1886 alongside James Ogilvie Clephane, who helped organize and provide the financial backing for commercialization.

== History ==
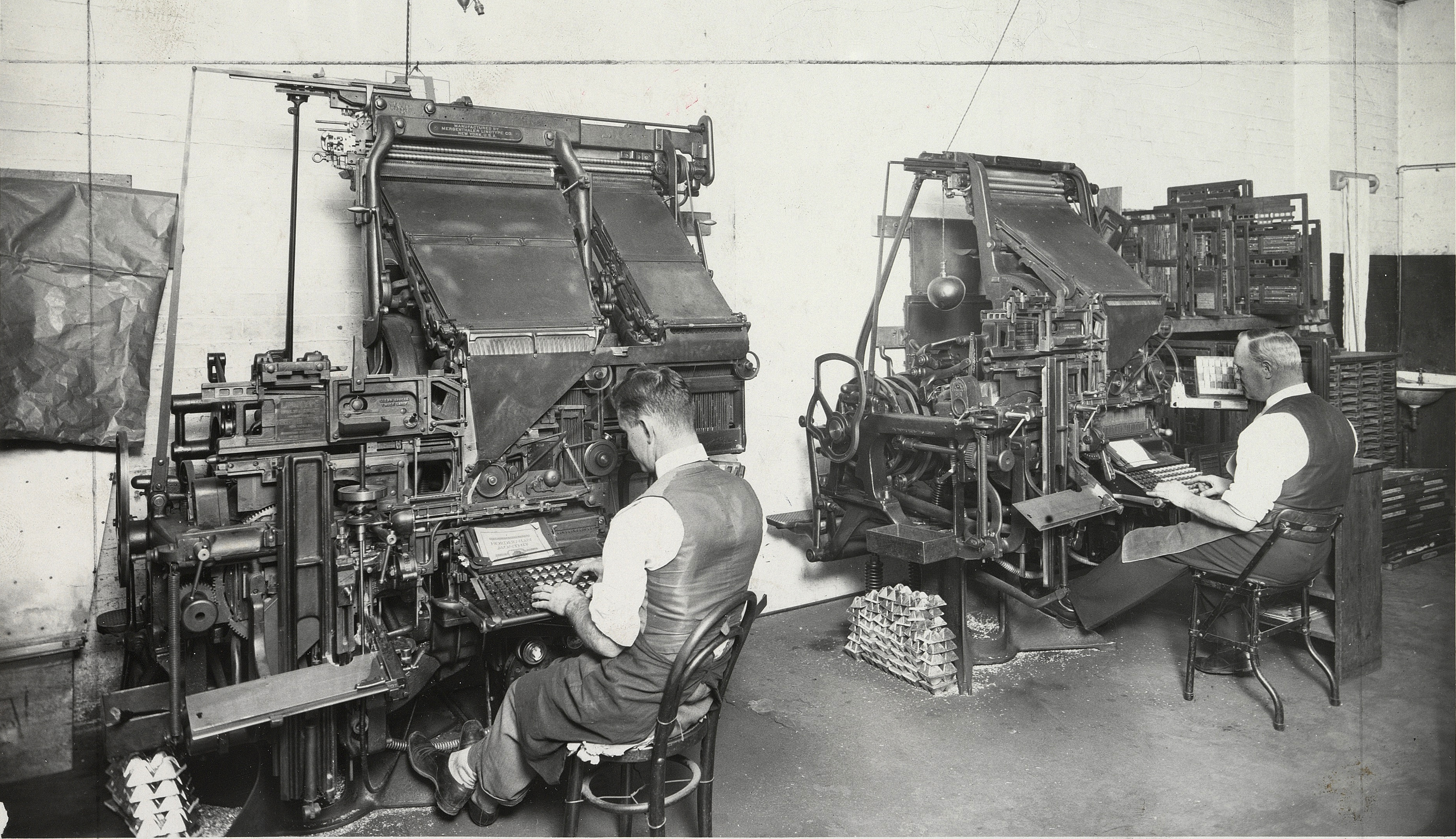
Linotype machines, Anthony Hordern and Sons department store, c. 1935, by A. E. Foster

In 1876, a German clock maker, Ottmar Mergenthaler, who had emigrated to the United States in 1872, was approached by James O. Clephane and his associate Charles T. Moore, who sought a quicker way of publishing legal briefs. By 1884, he conceived the idea of assembling metallic letter molds, called matrices, and casting molten metal into them, all within a single machine. His first attempt proved the idea feasible and a new company was formed. Improving his invention, Mergenthaler further developed his idea of an independent matrix machine. In July, 1886, the first commercially used Linotype was installed in the printing office of the New York Tribune. Here, it was immediately used on the daily paper and a large book. The book, the first ever composed with the new Linotype method, was titled The Tribune Book of Open-Air Sports.

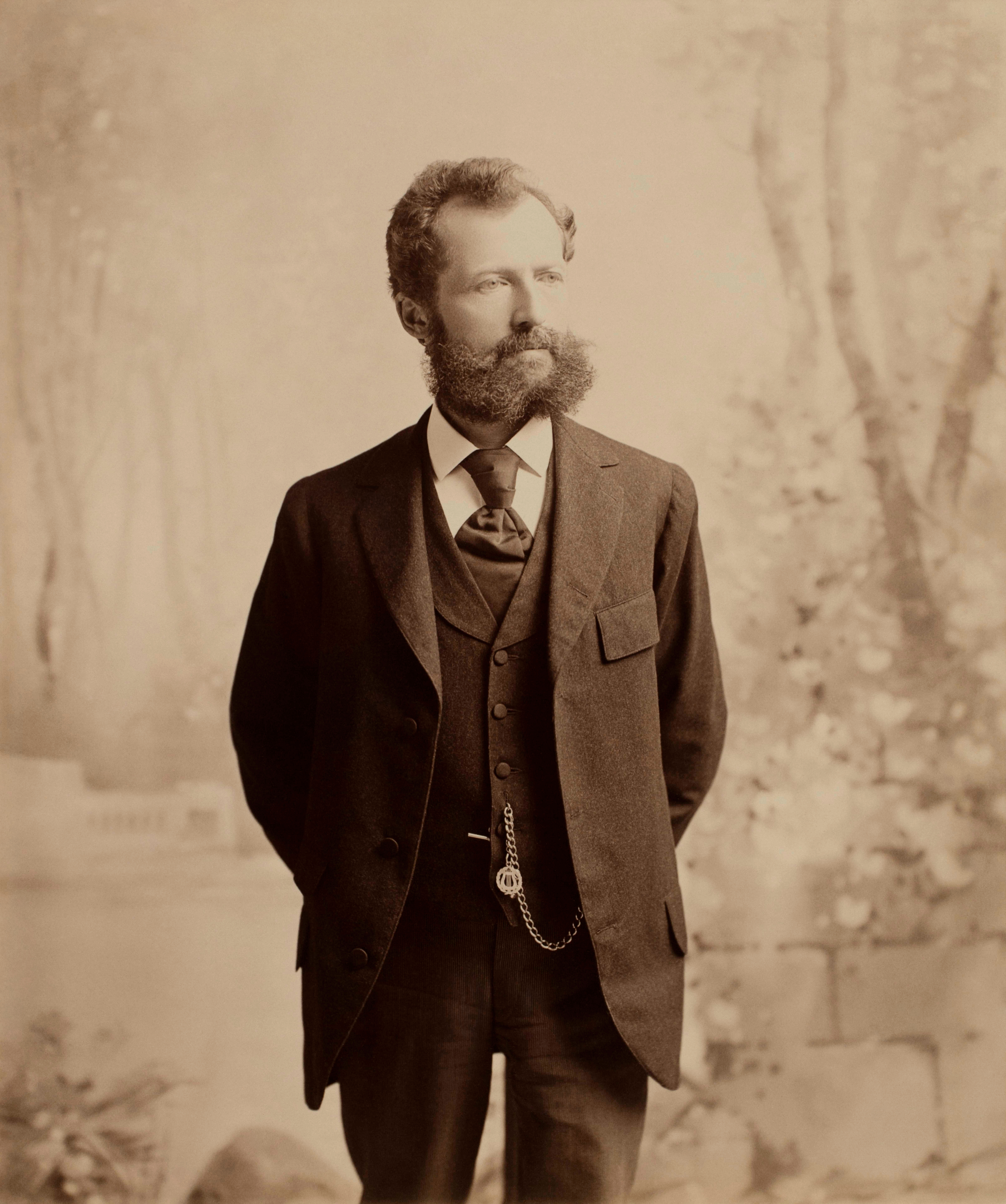
Ottmar Mergenthaler

Initially, the Mergenthaler Linotype Company (led by Ottmar Mergenthaler and eventually also James O. Clephane) held the patents producing linecasting machines. This created an environment in which only Linotype could produce new machines. A patent war with the Typograph from R. Rogers, invented around the same time, started soon, but several companies (including Linotype itself) bought old machines and made improved versions of it. After the patents expired, other companies would begin manufacturing similar machines: The Intertype Company started producing its own Intertypes around 1914, a machine closely resembling the Linotype and using the same matrices as the Linotype.

Major newspaper publishers retired Linotype and similar "hot metal" typesetting machines during the 1970s and 1980s, replacing them with phototypesetting equipment and later computerized typesetting and page composition systems. As of 2023, the last-known newspaper still using Linotype in the United States is The Saguache Crescent in Colorado. Le Démocrate de l'Aisne is the last one in Western Europe. The Brazilian newspaper O Taquaryense, published in Taquari, Rio Grande do Sul, also continues to use Linotype and traditional typographic printing methods.

== Overview ==
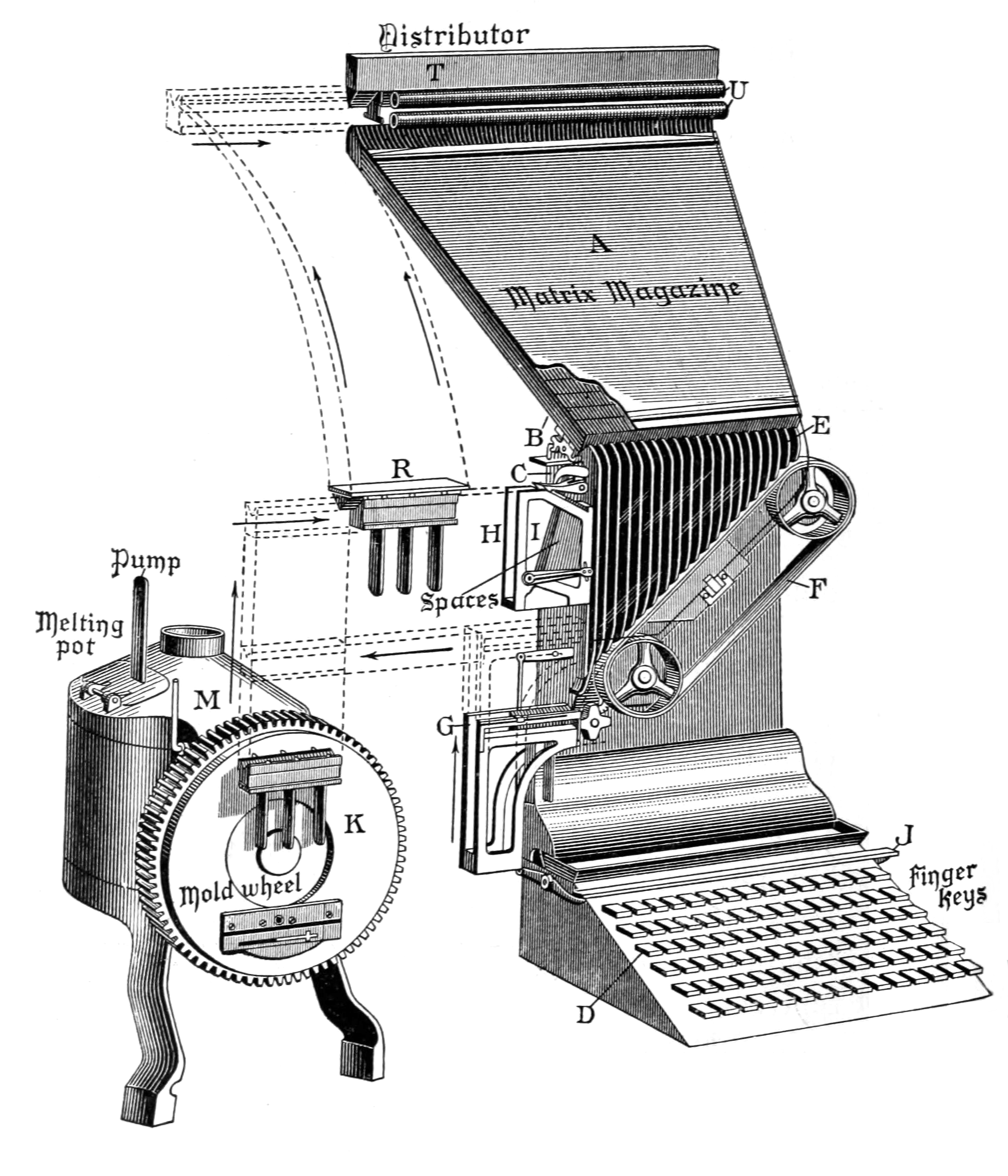
Diagram showing the overall scheme of a Linotype machine

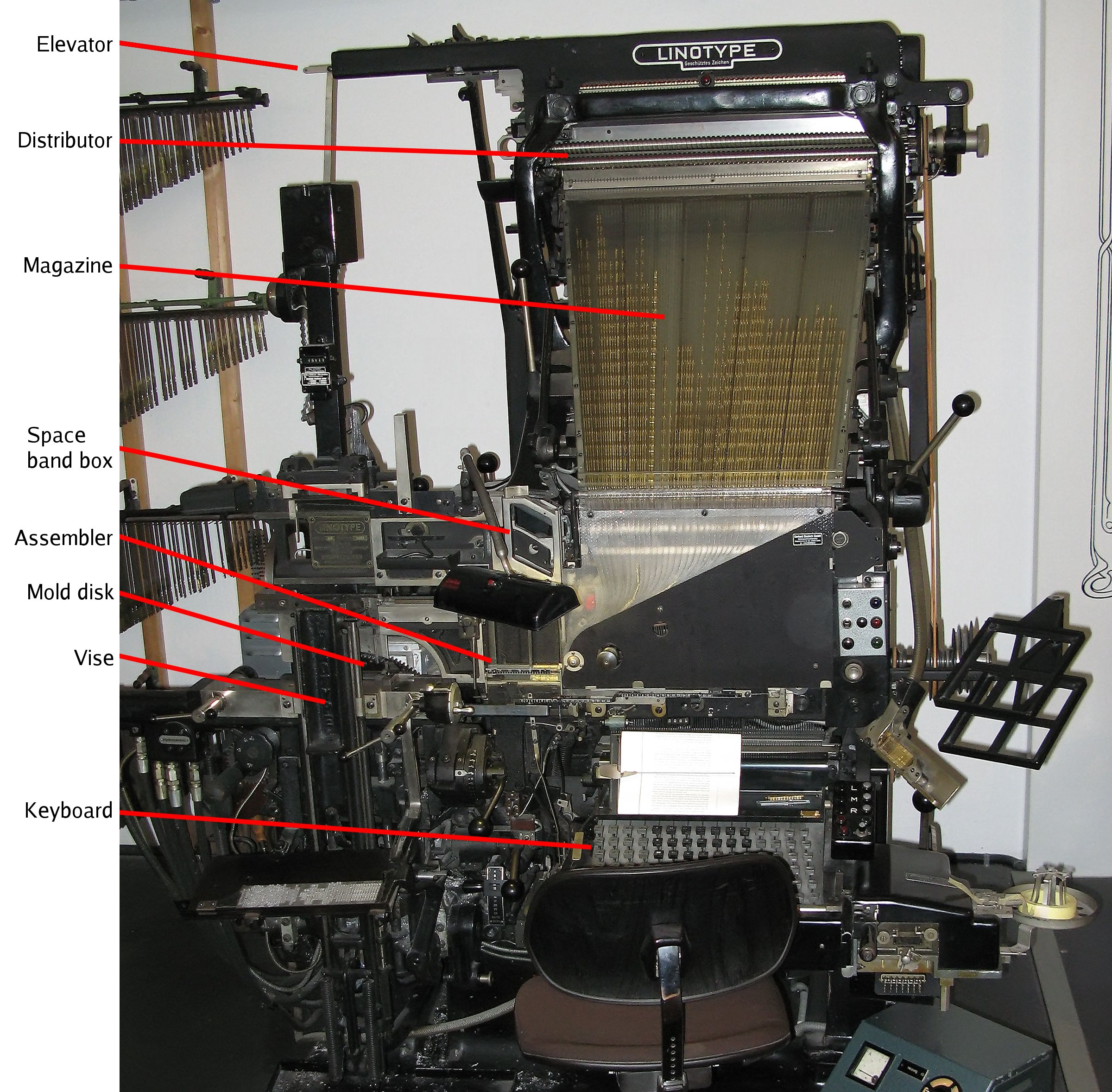
Paper tape controlled Linotype Model 5cS, manufactured in Germany (on display at Deutsches Museum, Munich)

The linotype machine consists of four major sections:

1. Magazine
2. Keyboard
3. Casting mechanism
4. Distribution mechanism

The operator interacts with the machine via the keyboard, composing lines of text. The other sections are automatic; they start as soon as a line is completely composed.

Some Linotype machines included a paper tape reader. This also allowed the text to be typeset to be supplied over a telegraph line (TeleTypeSetter). Perforator operators produced paper tape text at a much higher speed which then was cast by more productive tape-controlled Linotype machines.

== Design ==
=== Matrices ===
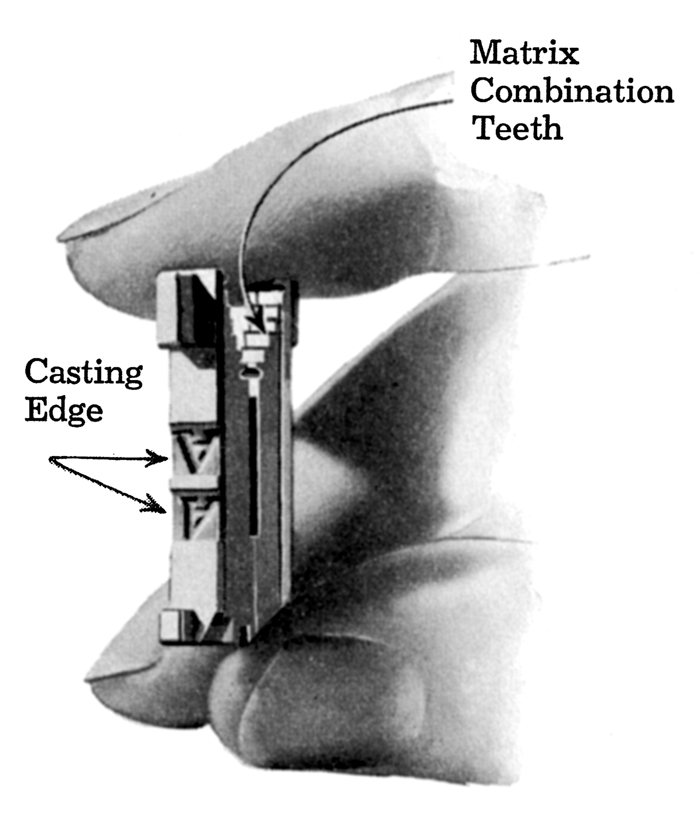
The Linotype matrix

Each matrix contains the letter form(s) for a single (or double) character(s) of a font of type; i.e., a particular type face in a particular size. The letter forms are engraved into one side of the matrix. The most common matrix has two letter forms on it, the normal and auxiliary positions. The normal position has the upright (Roman) form of a given character, and on the auxiliary, the slanted (Italic) form of that character will be used, but this can also be the boldface form or even a different font entirely. The machine operator can select which of the two faces will be cast by operating the auxiliary rail of the assembler, or, when setting entire lines of italics, by using the flap, which is a piece that can be turned under a portion of the first elevator column. This is the origin of the old typesetting terms upper rail for italic and lower rail for Roman characters. These terms persisted into phototypesetting technology even though the mechanics of the auxiliary rail do not exist there. The character on a Linotype matrix, when viewed, is incised below the surface rather than raised above it. This is because the matrix is not used directly to print onto the paper—rather, it is used as the mold from which a metal slug will be cast.

=== Magazine section ===
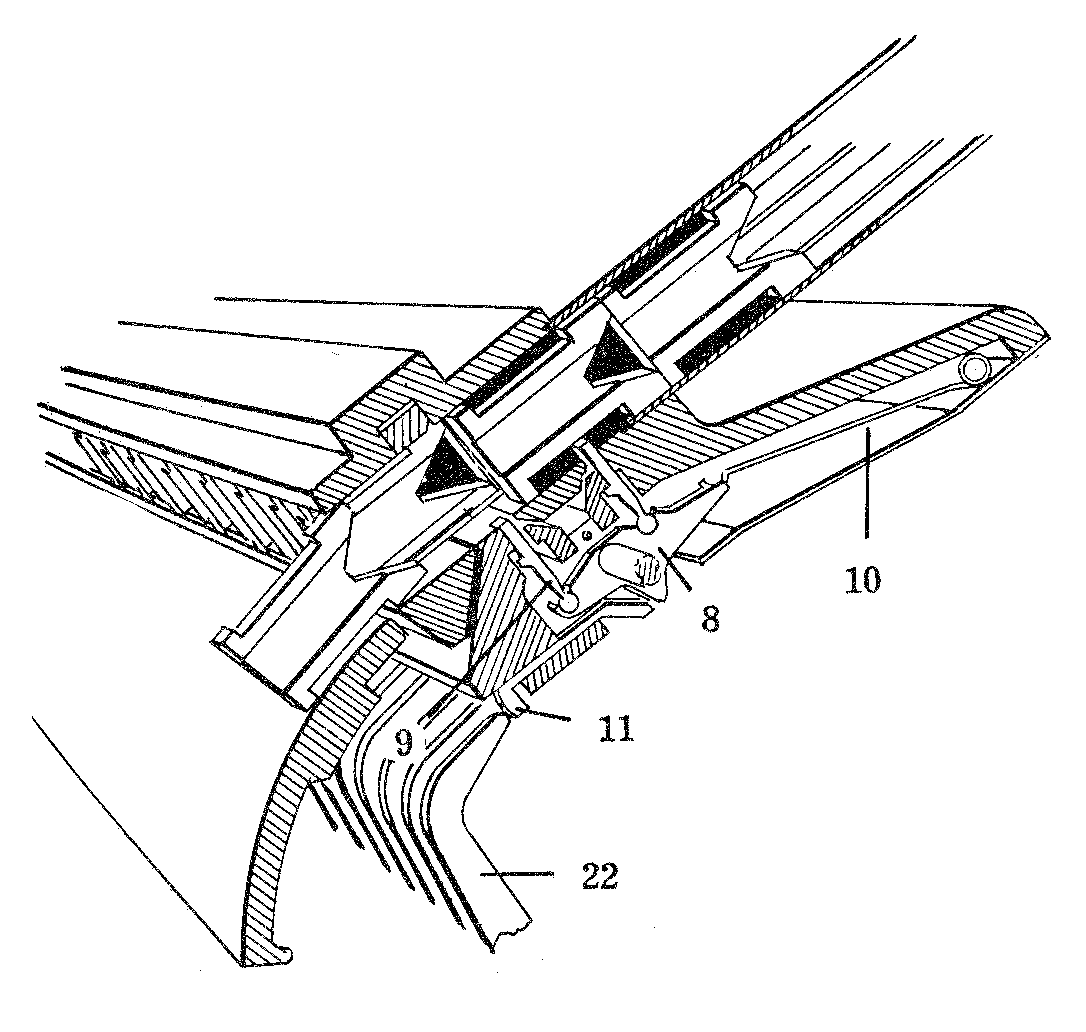
Action of the escapement when delivering a matrix. The keyboard has raised the escapement lever 22 to push against the plunger 11. This rotates the verge 8 which pulls down the front pawl 9, releasing the first matrix in the magazine channel. The rotation of the verge also raises rear pawl 8 to hold the second matrix.

The magazine section is the part of the machine where the matrices are held when not in use, and released as the operator touches keys on the keyboard. The magazine is a flat box with vertical separators that form "channels", one channel for each character in the font. Most main magazines have 90 channels, but those for larger fonts carried only 72 or even 55 channels. The auxiliary magazines used on some machines typically contained 34 channels or, for a magazine carrying larger fonts, 28 channels.

The magazine holds a particular font of type; i.e., a particular type design in a particular size. If a different size or style was needed, the operator would switch to a different magazine. Many models of the Linotype machine could keep several magazines (as many as four) available at a time. In some of these, the operator could shift to a different magazine by raising or lowering the stack of magazines with a crank. Such machines would not allow mixing fonts within a single line. Others, such as the Models 25 and 26 allowed arbitrary mixing of text from two magazines within the same line, and the Model 9 extended this capability to mixing from up to four magazines within a single line.

==== Escapement ====
In a linotype machine, the term escapements refers to the mechanisms at the bottom of the magazine that release matrices one at a time as keys are pressed on the keyboard. There is an escapement for each channel in the magazine.

==== Maintenance and lubrication ====
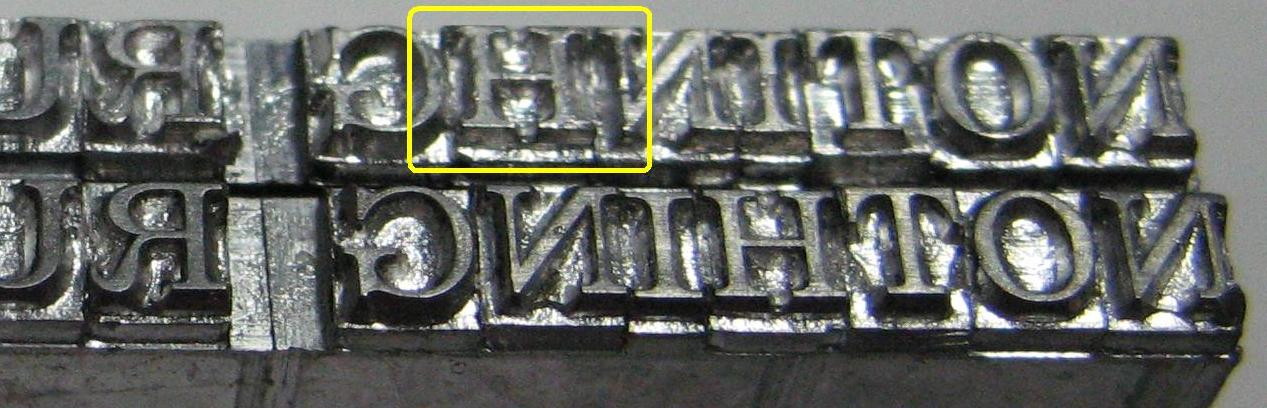
Matrix transposition

To keep the matrices circulating smoothly throughout the machine, it is necessary that oil not be allowed anywhere near the matrix path. Oil in the matrix's path (due to careless maintenance or over-lubrication of nearby parts) can combine with dust, forming a gummy substance that is eventually deposited in the magazine by the matrices. This can cause the matrix to be released from the magazine slower than its usual speed, and usually results in a letter or two arriving out of sequence in the assembler — a "matrix transposition". When these machines were in heavy use, it was not uncommon for an operator to set type at the rate of over 4,000 ems per hour. The fastest operators could exceed 10,000 ems per hour (approximately 10 to 30 words per minute in today's units), hence careful lubrication and regular cleaning were essential to keep these machines operating at full potential.

=== Keyboard and composing section ===
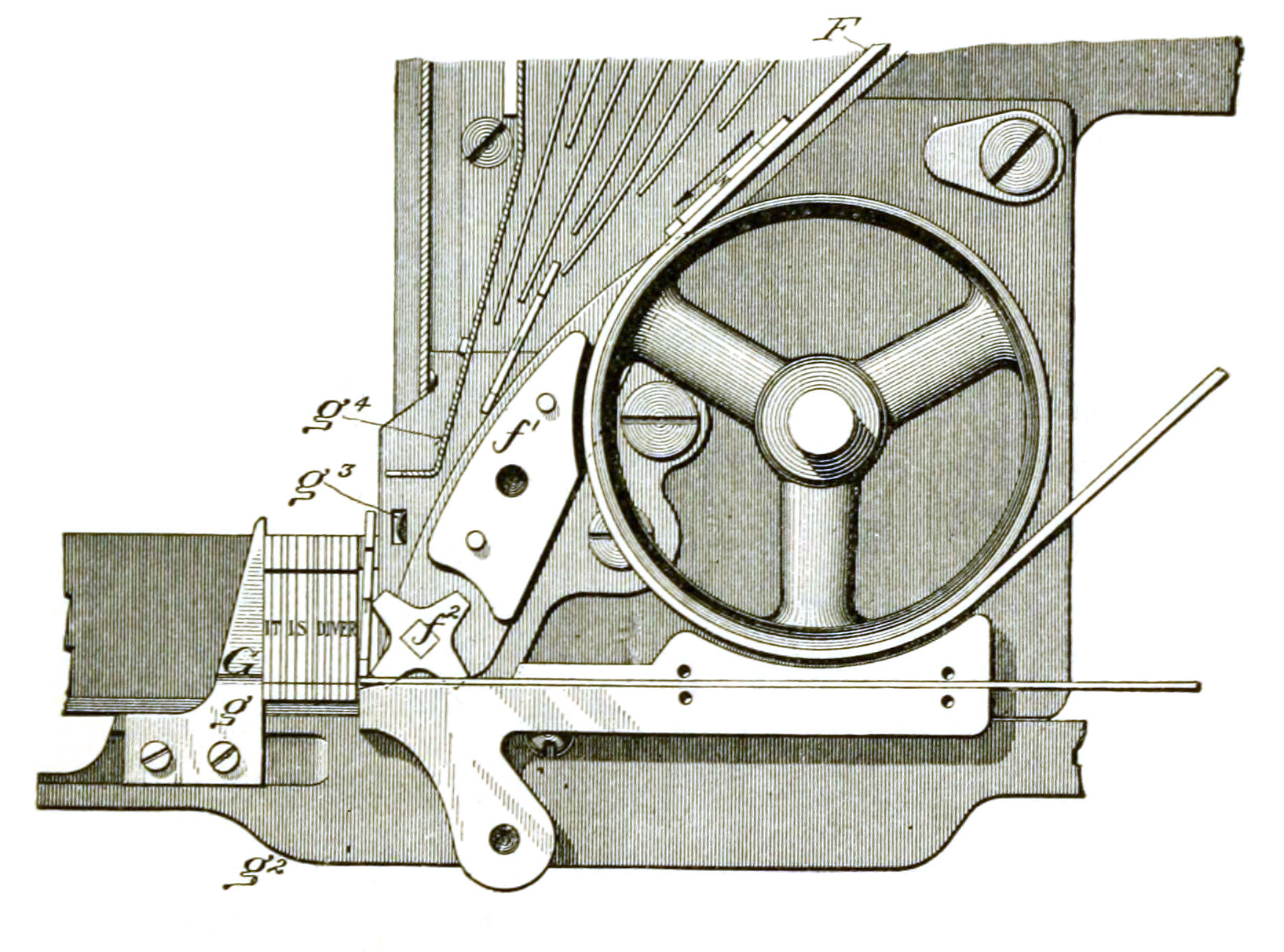
Diagram of the assembler mechanism, showing how the matrices go from the magazine and are put into place in line being formed (in a machine ca. 1904)

In the composing section, the operator enters the text for a line on the keyboard. Each keystroke releases a matrix from the magazine mounted above the keyboard. The matrix travels through channels to the assembler where the matrices are lined up side by side in the order they were released.

When a space is needed, the operator touches the spaceband lever just to the left of the keyboard. This releases a spaceband from the spaceband box. Spacebands are stored separately from the matrices because they are too big to fit in the magazine.

Once enough text has been entered for the line, the operator depresses the casting lever mounted on the front right corner of the keyboard. This lifts the completed line in the assembler up between two fingers in the "delivery channel", simultaneously tripping the catch holding it in position. The spring-operated delivery channel then transports the line into the casting section of the machine, and engages the clutch that drives the casting section and the subsequent transfer into the distribution section. The operator is now finished with the line; the remaining processing is automatic. While the line is being cast, the operator can continue entering text for the next line.

==== Keyboard ====
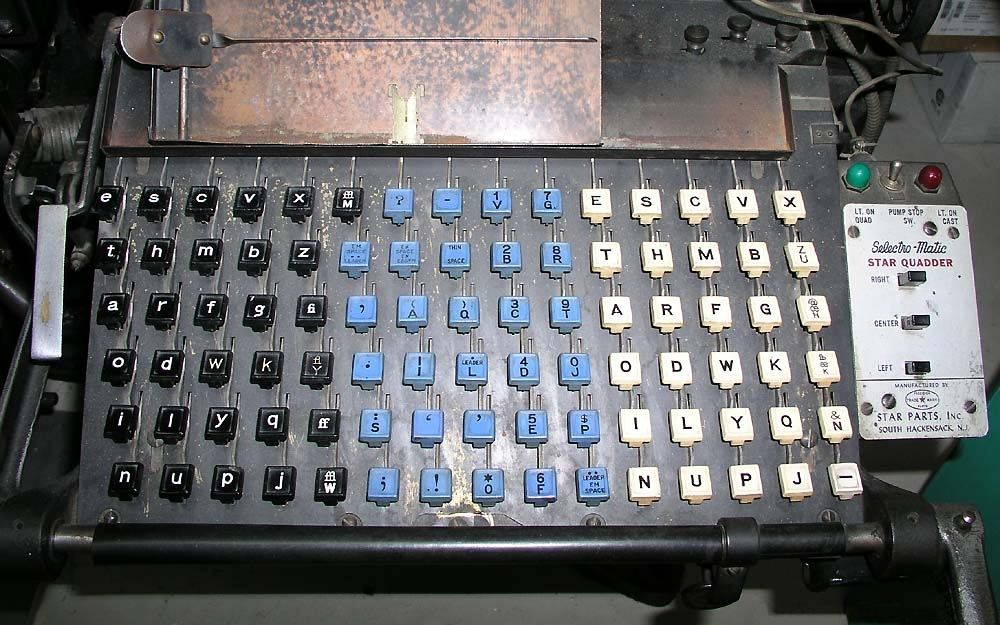
Linotype keyboard; an after-market Star Quadder attachment (selectively off, flush-right, -center or -left) is to its immediate right.

The keyboard has 90 keys. The usual arrangement is that black keys on the left were for small letters, white keys on the right were for capital letters, and blue keys in the center for digits, punctuation marks, spaces, small capital letters, and other items. There is no shift key of the kind found on typewriters.

The arrangement of letters corresponds roughly to letter frequency, with the most frequently used letters on the left. The first two columns of keys are: e, t, a, o, i, n; and s, h, r, d, l, u.

Because the left column letters make up about a half of letters in most English texts, an experienced operator can operate only the spaceband key and the left column of keys with their left hand and all the remaining keys with their right hand.

In case of an error, the operator would often run his fingers down the first two columns, thus filling out the line with the nonsense words etaoin shrdlu, in what is known as a "run down". It is often quicker to cast a bad slug than to hand-correct the line within the assembler. The slug with the run down is removed once it has been cast, or by the proofreader.

The keys of the keyboard are connected by vertical pushrods to the escapements. When a key is pressed, the corresponding escapement is actuated, which releases a matrix from the magazine. With one exception, each key corresponds directly to a channel in the standard (90 channel) magazine. The one exception is the lower-case letter e: that letter is used so often that the 90 channel magazine actually has 91 channels, with two channels (the leftmost two) both used for the letter e. Similarly, the 72 channel magazine actually has 73 channels, with the leftmost two being used for lower-case e. Alternate lines release matrices alternately from the two e channels in the magazine.

On machines that support multiple magazines, there is a shifting mechanism that controls which magazine is currently connected to the keyboard. In most machines, this is done by raising or lowering the stack of magazines.

==== Spaceband box ====
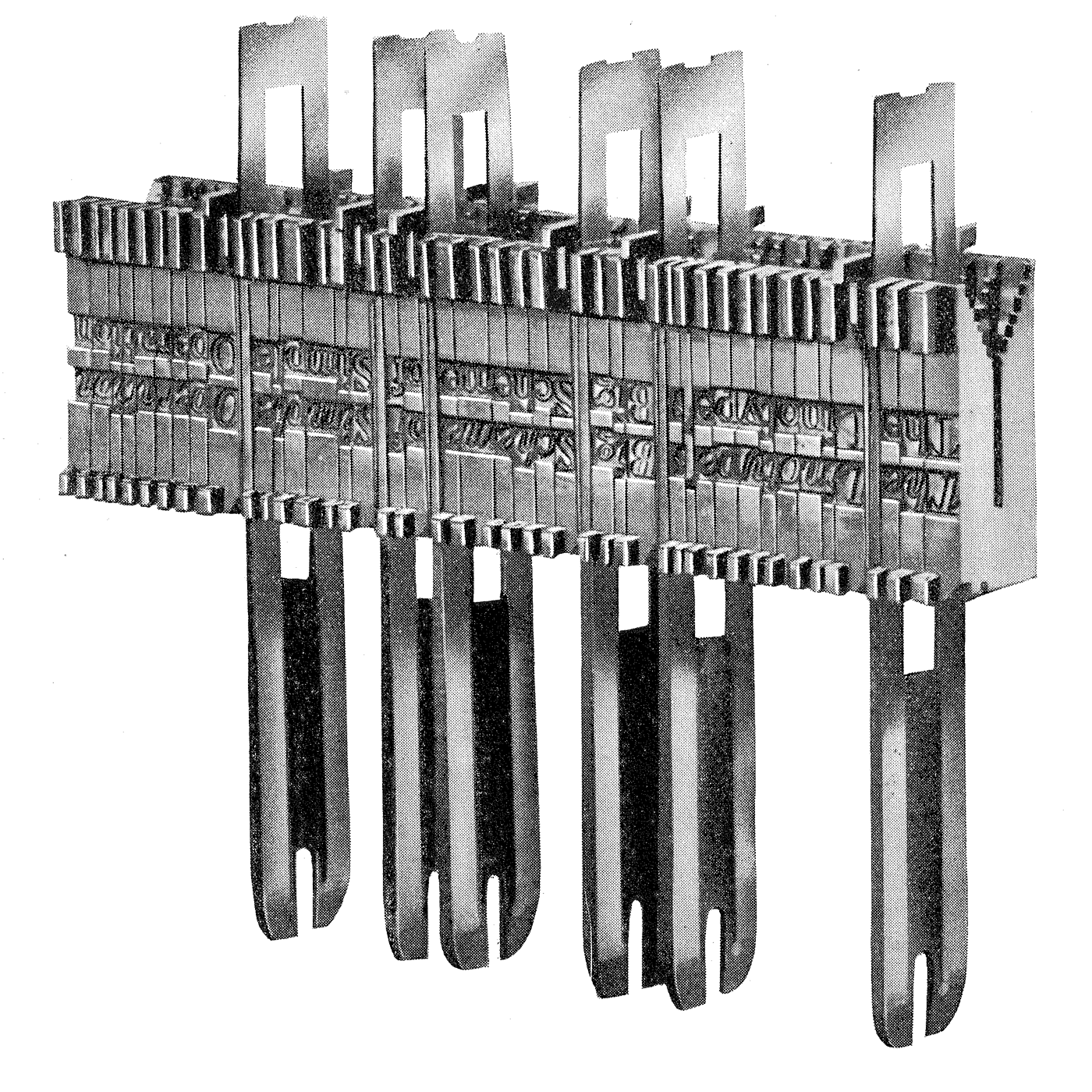
Composed line with matrices and spacebands

In justified text, the spaces are not fixed width; they expand to make all lines equal in width. In linotype machines this is done by spacebands. A spaceband consists of two wedges, one similar in size and shape to a type matrix, one with a long tail. The wide part of the wedge is at the bottom of the tail, so pushing the tail up expands the spaceband.

Due to their size, spacebands are not held in the magazine, but in a spaceband box and released one at a time by pressing the spaceband lever at the left edge of the keyboard.

==== Assembler ====
As the matrices are released from the magazine, they are guided by way of partitions in the assembler front down to a rapidly moving belt, which brings the matrices into the assembler. The spaceband box is positioned above the assembler, the bands dropping almost directly into the assembler. At the end of the moving belt is a rapidly rotating 'star wheel' that gives each incoming matrix or spaceband a small kick to make room for the next one (the star wheel is made of a phenolic-type material to minimize wear of the matrices and bands).

The assembler itself is a rail that holds the matrices and spacebands, with a jaw on the left end set to the desired line width. When the operator judges that the line is close enough to full (some machines have an attached bell to accomplish the same thing), he raises the casting lever on the bottom of the keyboard to send the line to the casting section of the linotype machine. The remaining processing for that line is automatic; as soon as the finished line has been transferred to the casting section, the operator can begin composing the next line of text.

=== Casting section ===
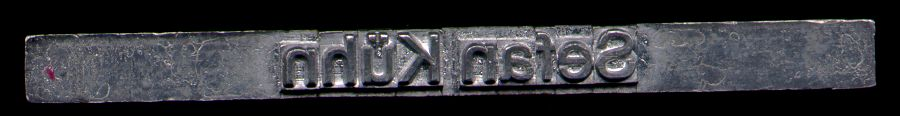
Type slug – Print side

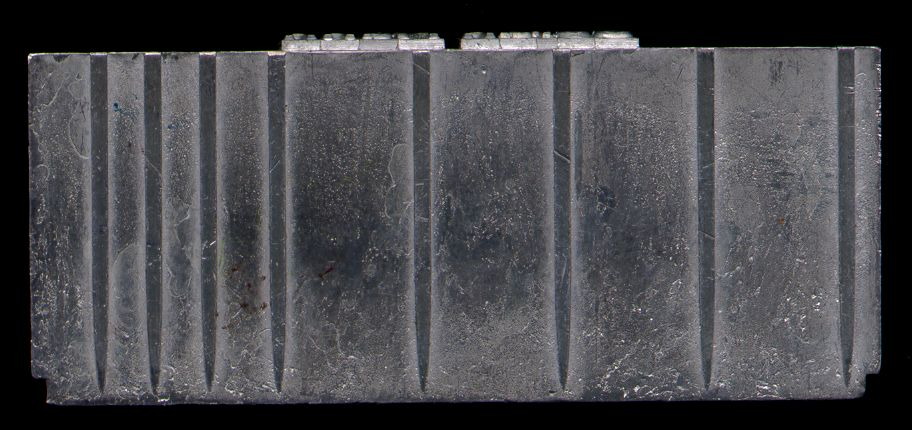
Type slug, side view

The casting section of the machine operated intermittently when triggered by the operator at the completion of a line. The full casting cycle time was less than nine seconds. Motive power for the casting section came from a clutch-operated drive running large cams (the keyboard and distributor sections ran all the time, since distribution may take much longer; however, the front part of the distributor completed its job before the next line of matrices was distributed). The construction of the machine was such that both the return of the former line to the magazine and the composition of the next line could occur while the current line was being cast, enabling very high productivity.

Older machines typically had a 1/3-horsepower (250 W) 850- or 1140-revolution-per-minute motor geared to the main clutch wheel, the inner shaft engaging this wheel while the casting cycle was in operation. An external leather belt on this wheel ran a second jackshaft, which powered the distributor and keyboard matrix conveyor and escapements through additional belting off this shaft. Gas fired pots, such as in the illustration below, were most common in the earlier years, with the pot being thermostatically controlled (high flame when under temperature and low flame when up to temperature), and then a second smaller burner for the mouth and throat heating, with the more modern installations running on 1500 watt electric pots with an initially rheostat controlled mouth and throat heaters (several hundred watts on the electric models). The temperature was precisely adjusted to keep the lead and tin type metal liquified just prior to being cast. Newer machines, and the larger machines above 36 EM Matrix size typically used the more standardized 1/2-horsepower (370 W) motor after v-belts came into common use in the 1930s. The large machines also had the so-called "double pot", with either larger gas burners, or else 2250-watt pot heaters and larger mouth and throat heaters. The most modern Linotypes had the mouth and throat heaters thermostatically controlled, an improvement over the manual rheostat adjustment, or gas flame adjustment. The Linotype company supplied kerosene heaters and line-shaft operated machines for use in locales without electricity.

The casting section receives completed lines from the assembler, and uses these to cast the type slugs that are the product of the linotype machine. The casting section is automatic: once it is activated by the operator sending a completed line by raising the casting lever, a series of cams and levers move the matrices through the casting section and control the sequence of steps that produce the slug.

The casting material is an alloy of lead (85%), antimony (11%), and tin (4%), and produces a one-piece casting slug capable of 300,000 impressions before the casting begins to develop deformities and imperfections, and the type must be cast again.

The continuous heating of the molten alloy causes the tin and antimony in the mixture to rise to the top and oxidize along with other impurities into a substance called "dross" which must be skimmed off. Excessive dross formation leads to the alloy softening as the proportion of lead increases. The mixture must then be assayed and tin and antimony added back (in the form of a specially proportioned alloy) to restore the original strength and properties of the alloy.

==== Justification ====
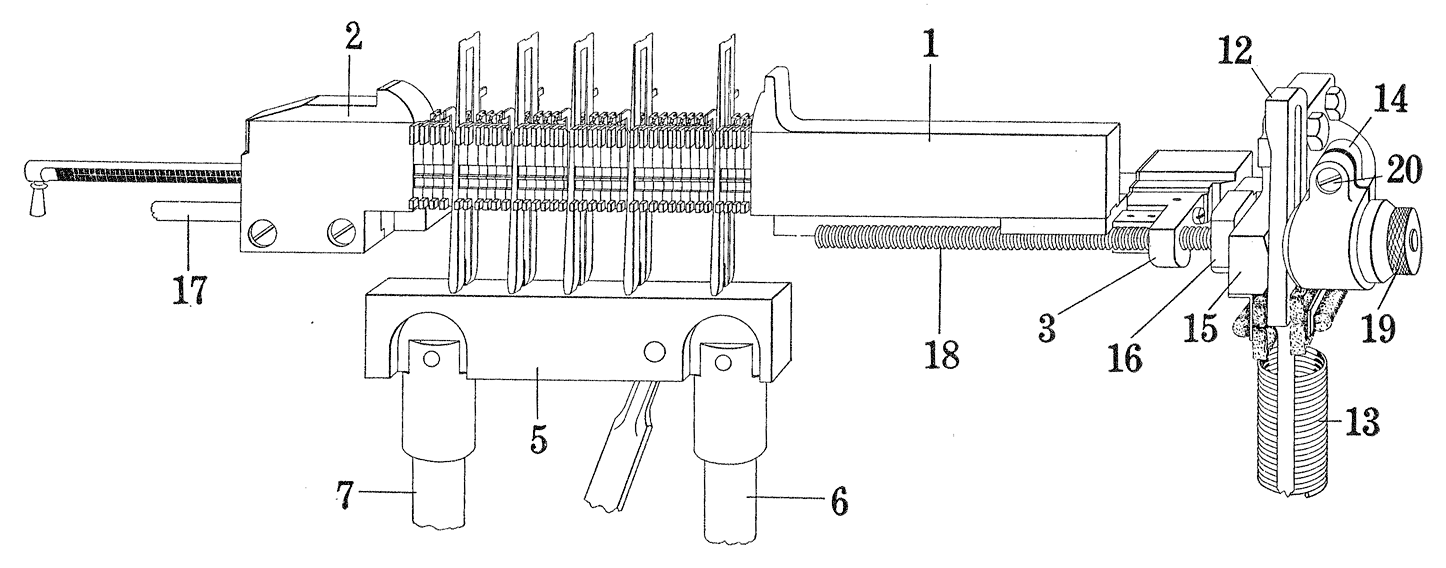
Diagram of the justification process. The composed line is locked up between the jaws (1 and 2) of the vise. The justification ram (5) then moves up to expand the spacebands to fill the space between the vise jaws.

From the assembler, the assembled line moves via the first elevator to the justification vise. The vise has two jaws (1 and 2 in the illustration) which are set to the desired line width. The spacebands are now expanded to justify the line. When the line is justified, the matrices fit tightly between the vise jaws, forming a tight seal that will prevent the molten type metal from escaping when the line is cast.

Justification is done by a spring-loaded ram (5) which raises the tails of the spacebands, unless the machine was equipped with a Star Parts automatic hydraulic quadding attachment or Linotype hydraquadder.

There would be occasions where the operator would send in a line too short to properly justify, or attempt to send in a line slightly too long for the machine to handle. Either situation had the potential to cause damage to the machine, most often in the form of a squirt of molten type metal (covering the front of the casting area and the floor in front). Both Linotype and Intertype machines included two important safety mechanisms, that if properly adjusted, prevent this from happening. If a line is slightly too long, the first elevator will not seat fully between the vise jaws before the alignment process begins, resulting in a squirt and crushed matrix lugs. The first of these safeties, the vise automatic, stops the machine if the first elevator does not fully descend in time. As the alignment and justification cycle progresses, one of the vise jaws has just enough motion to engage the second safety, the pump stop. When the line justifies properly, the pump stop moves out of the way, allowing the pump lever to descend into the pot and push the molten type metal into the mold.

==== Mold disk and crucible ====
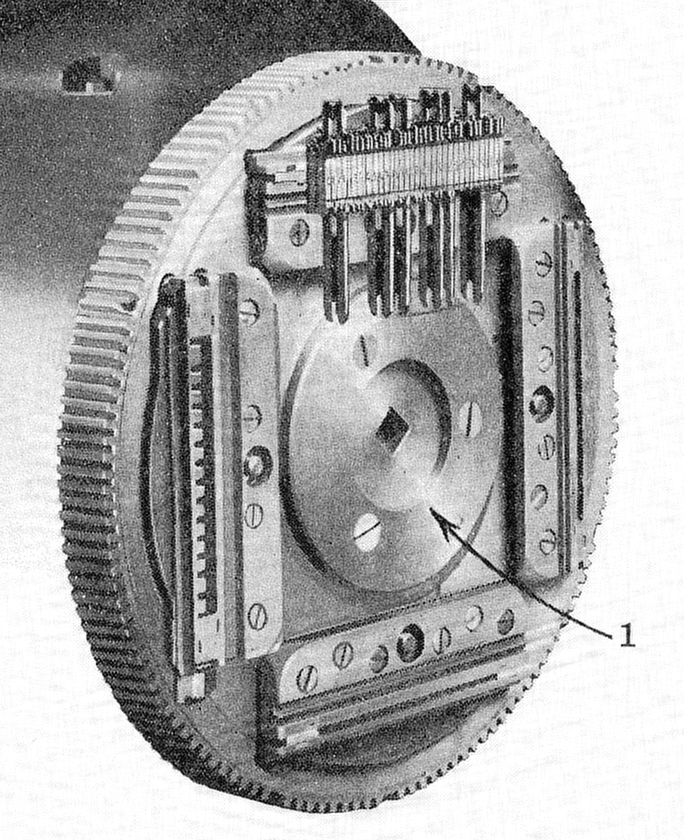
Linotype mold disk, with a complete line of matrices and spacebands ready to be cast

The justification vise holds the assembled line against the face of the mold disk. The mold disk has rectangular openings which correspond to the line length and point thickness of the slugs (cast lines) to be made. Mold liners fit into these openings for specific slug dimensions. The standard maximum line length of the typical linecaster is 30 picas. The company did offer a 42-pica maximum length option, but this required a correspondingly larger mold disk, crucible, and supporting components; this was a seldom-ordered option back then and these are likely nearly nonexistent today.

Directly behind the mold disk is the crucible, which contains molten type metal at an optimal 280 °C (536 °F). At the moment before casting, the mold disk moves forward on its slide. Studs in the mold disc engage with blocks on the vise so that the mold disc seats gently, yet tightly and squarely against the line of matrices held in the first elevator jaws and between the vise jaws. The vise jaws compress the line of matrices so molten metal is prevented from squeezing between the mats on cast. The crucible tilts forward, forcing the mouthpiece tightly against the back of the mold. The plunger in the well of the crucible quickly descends, forcing the molten metal up the crucible throat and injecting it into the mold cavity through the array of orifices in the mouthpiece. The jets of molten metal first contact against the casting face of the matrices, and then fills the mold cavity to provide a solid slug body. These have character shapes punched into them, so the result is a cast slug with the character shapes of the line on its top face. The mold disk is sometimes water-cooled, and often air-cooled with a blower, to carry away the heat of the molten type metal and allow the cast slugs to solidify quickly.

When casting is complete, the plunger is drawn upward, pulling the metal back down the throat from the mouthpiece. The pot pulls backward away from the mold. The mold disk retracts from the vise studs which held it in perfect relation to the mold, thus breaking the slug away from the matrices. The mold disc then rotates counter-clockwise. In its travel, the slug base is trimmed by the back knife to a standard height for composing (known as type-high / .918") and then returns to its neutral position in front of the ejector blades and aligned with the knife block assembly a pair of honed knives with a fixed knife, and a knife which is set to the point thickness of the mold liners being cast with. The knives are set to dead parallel. The fixed knife on the left bears against the smooth side of the slug (the mold body face of the slug) as it brushes next to it, and the right knife trims the ribs on the slug (the mold cap face of the slug). The disk stops when the mold is vertical, on the right, directly in front of the ejector.

The ejector is a stacked series of narrow blades that push the completed slug from the mold aperture in the mold disk. The blades are narrow enough to pass through a mold set to 6-points in thickness with .004" clearance between the fixed mold face and the left side of the blades. The blades are each 2 picas in width and the number of blades engaged on ejection are set based on the line length being cast. All blades are engaged for a 30 pica slug, fewer are engaged as the measure of the slug body is narrowed by the use of progressively longer mold liners. This prevents the ejector blades from striking the back of a mold liner on narrow slugs. As the slug is pushed from the mold, the slug passes a set of knife edges in the knife block, which trims off any small irregularities in the casting and produces a slug of exactly the desired point thickness. From there, the slug drops into the galley tray which holds the lines in the order in which they were cast.

=== Distribution mechanism ===
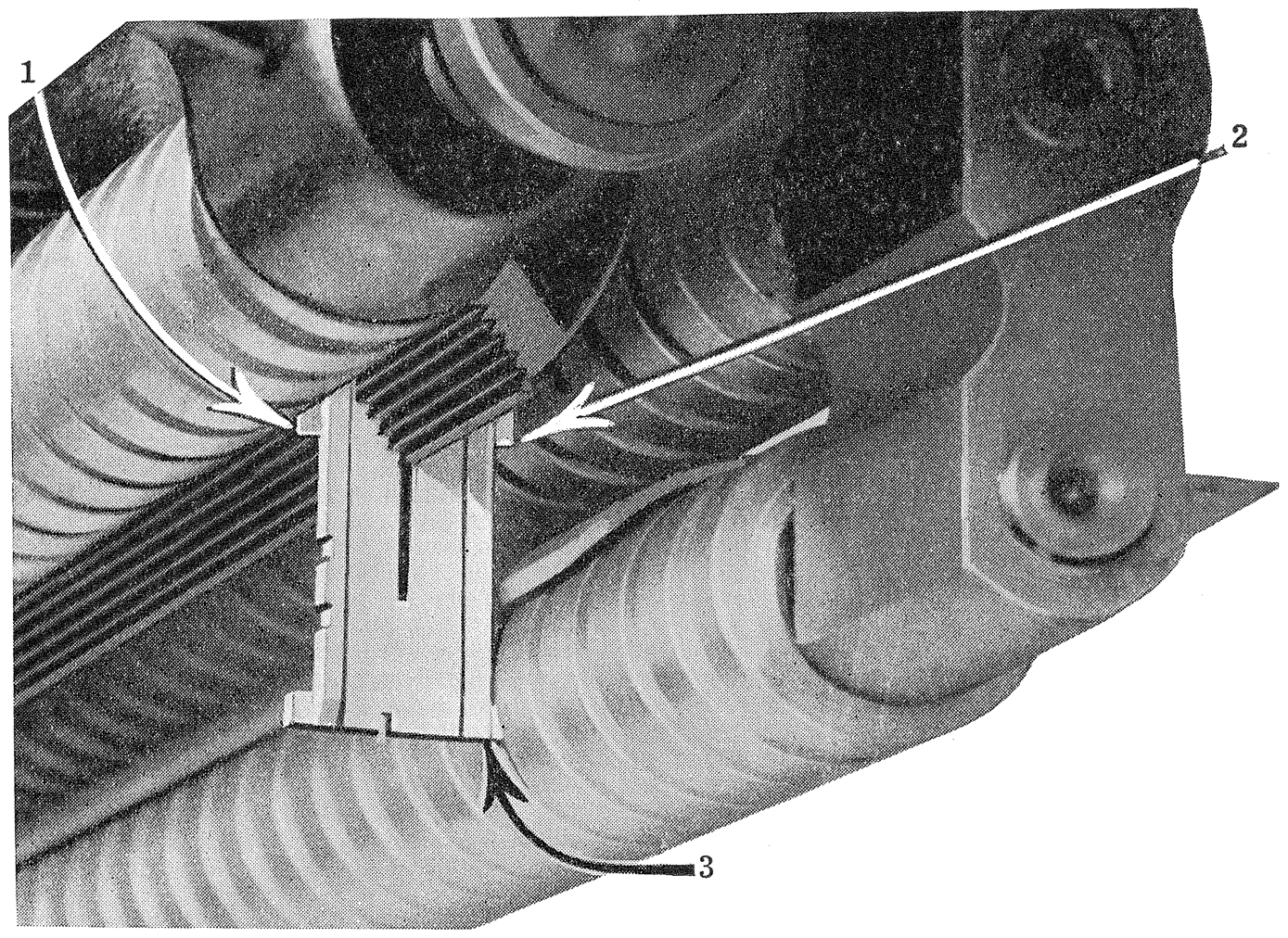
The linotype distributor rail with a matrix hanging from it. The three screws move the matrix along the rail until it drops into the correct magazine channel.

The most significant innovation in the linotype machine was that it automated the distribution step; i.e., returning the matrices and space bands back to the correct place in their respective magazines. This is done by the distributor.

After casting is completed, the matrices are pushed to the second elevator which raises them to the distributor at the top of the magazine. The space bands are separated out at this point and are returned to the spaceband box.

The matrices have a pattern of teeth at the top, by which they hang from the distributor bar. Some of the teeth are cut away; which pattern of teeth is cut away depends on the character on the matrix; i.e., which channel in the magazine it belongs in. Similarly, teeth are cut away along portions of the distributor bar. The bar on the elevator has all teeth, so it will hold any matrix (but not the space bands, which have no teeth at all).

==== Distributor bar and matrix teeth coding ====
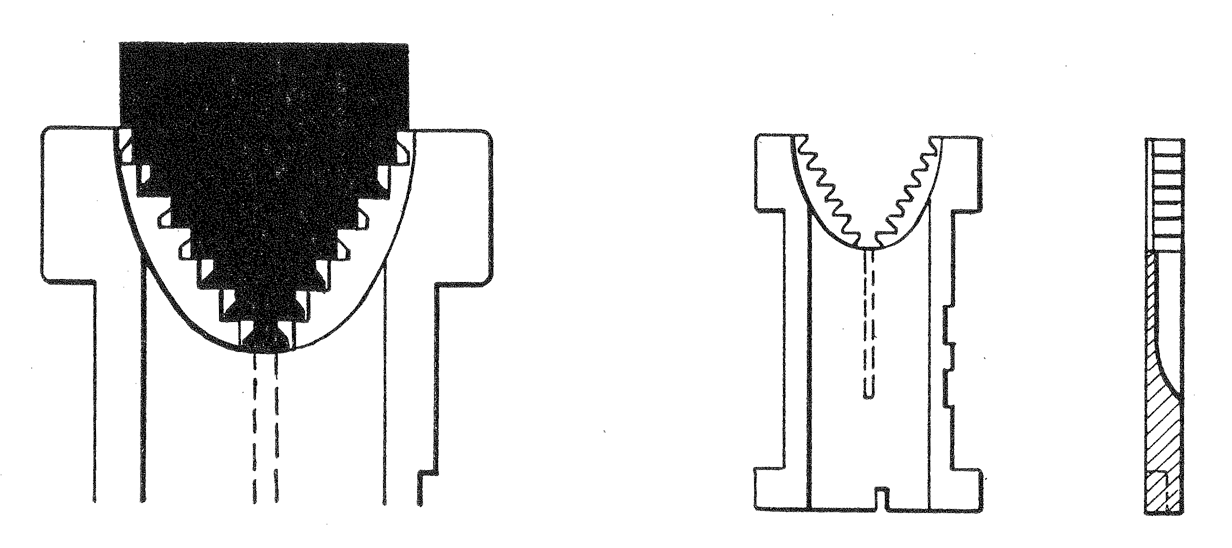
Diagram of linotype matrix teeth. In the drawing on the left, the matrix is about to drop because the only teeth on the rail (shown in black) correspond to tooth positions that are cut away on the matrix. The drawing in the middle shows a matrix with all teeth present—a pi matrix.

As the matrices are carried along the distributor bar by the distributor screws, they will hang on only so long as there are teeth to hold them. As soon as the matrix reaches the point where each of its teeth corresponds to a cut-away tooth on the distributor bar, it is no longer supported and will drop into the matrix channel below that point.

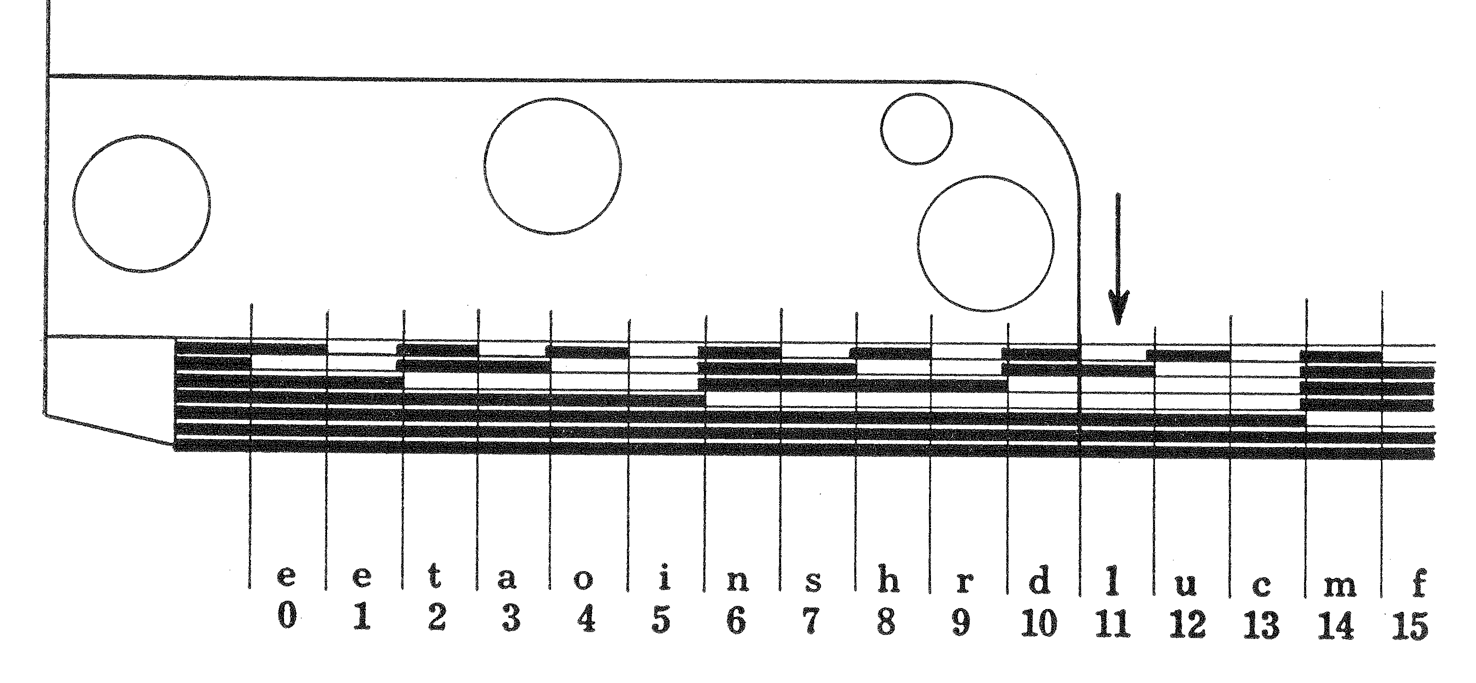
Diagram of tooth coding of the distributor rail, showing the first few positions of the rail. The coding is basically straight binary. The arrow shows where the matrix from the previous illustration would drop. Note that there are two positions for "e"; there are two magazine channels for that letter because of its high frequency.

The pattern of teeth is a 7-bit binary code, with the innermost pair of teeth at the bottom of the notch being the most significant bit. The codes count up from the left side of the main magazine. Code 0 (no teeth) is for spacebands, which are not carried up to the distributor. Code 1 is skipped (no reason for this is given in the Linotype manual). Codes 2 through 92 are for the 91-channel main magazine, and the codes above that are for the auxiliary magazine, if one is installed on the machine. The widest auxiliary magazine has 34 channels, so its rightmost channel is code 125. Code 126 is unused while code 127 is used for pi matrices (described below).

==== Pi matrices ====
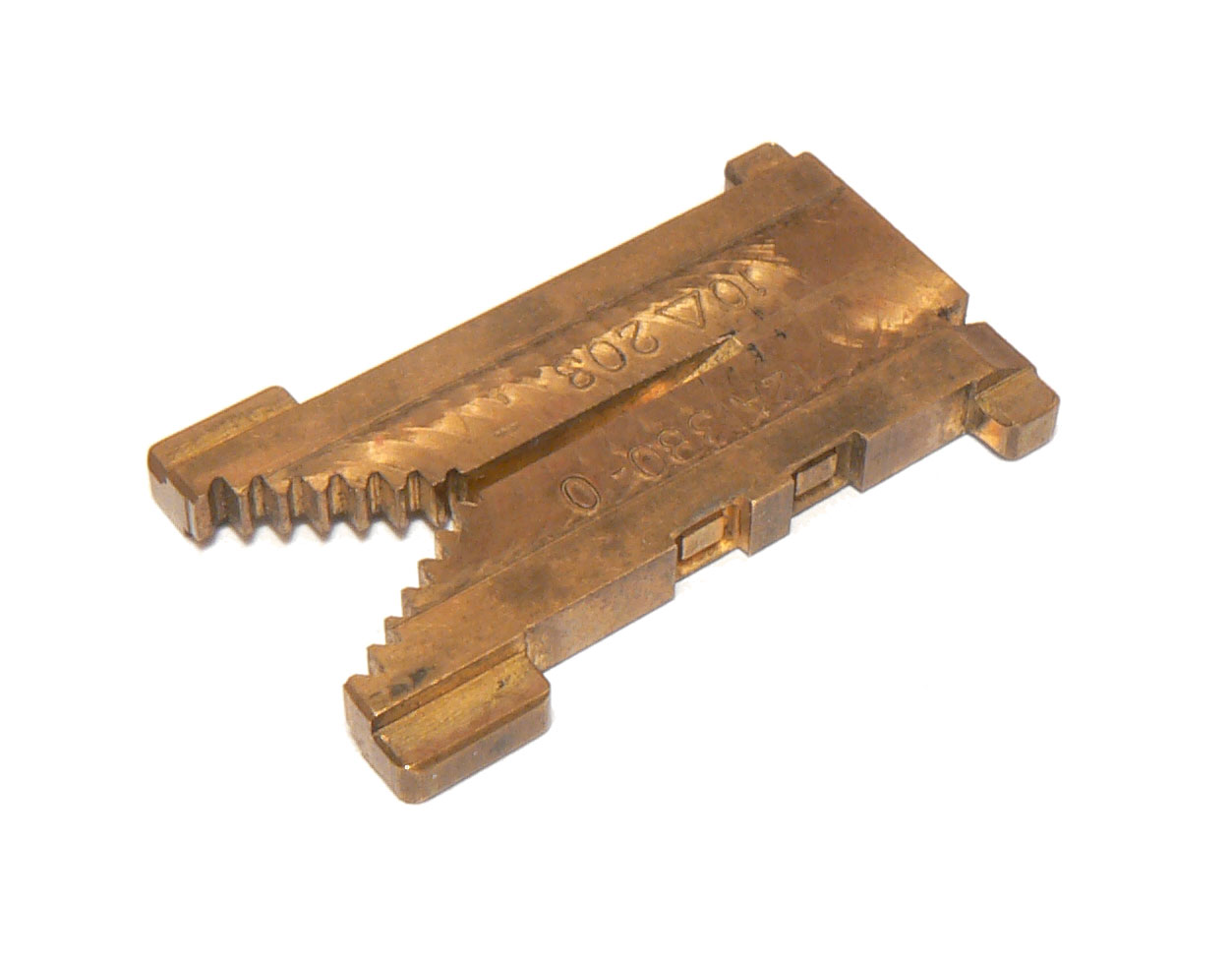
A Magnetic Ink Character Recognition (MICR) matrix, cut for code 127

In typesetting, it is sometimes necessary to use characters that are uncommon or obscure enough that it does not make sense to assign them to a magazine channel. These characters are referred to as pi characters or sorts. ("Pi" in this case refers to an obscure printer's term relating to loose or spilled type.) Footnote marks, rarely used fractions, and mathematical symbols are examples of pi characters. In the linotype machine, a pi matrix has all teeth present (code 127, no teeth cut away) so it will not drop from the distributor bar and will not be released into either the main or the auxiliary magazine. Instead, it travels all the way to the end and into the flexible metal tube called the pi chute and is then lined up in the sorts stacker, available for further use.

== Health hazards ==
Workers were at risk for lead poisoning and antimony poisoning, and mesothelioma caused by exposure to asbestos insulation. Asbestos fibers could go airborne when contaminated asbestos cement around the crucible was scraped out. The danger from lead and antimony was not from fumes in the casting room, but from dust, handling of castings (and failure to wash hands before eating), and fumes from melting of scraps.

Linotype machines that used gas burners needed to be well-ventilated to prevent buildup of carbon monoxide.

== See also ==
- Monotype system
- Monotype Corporation
- Lanston Monotype

== Notes ==
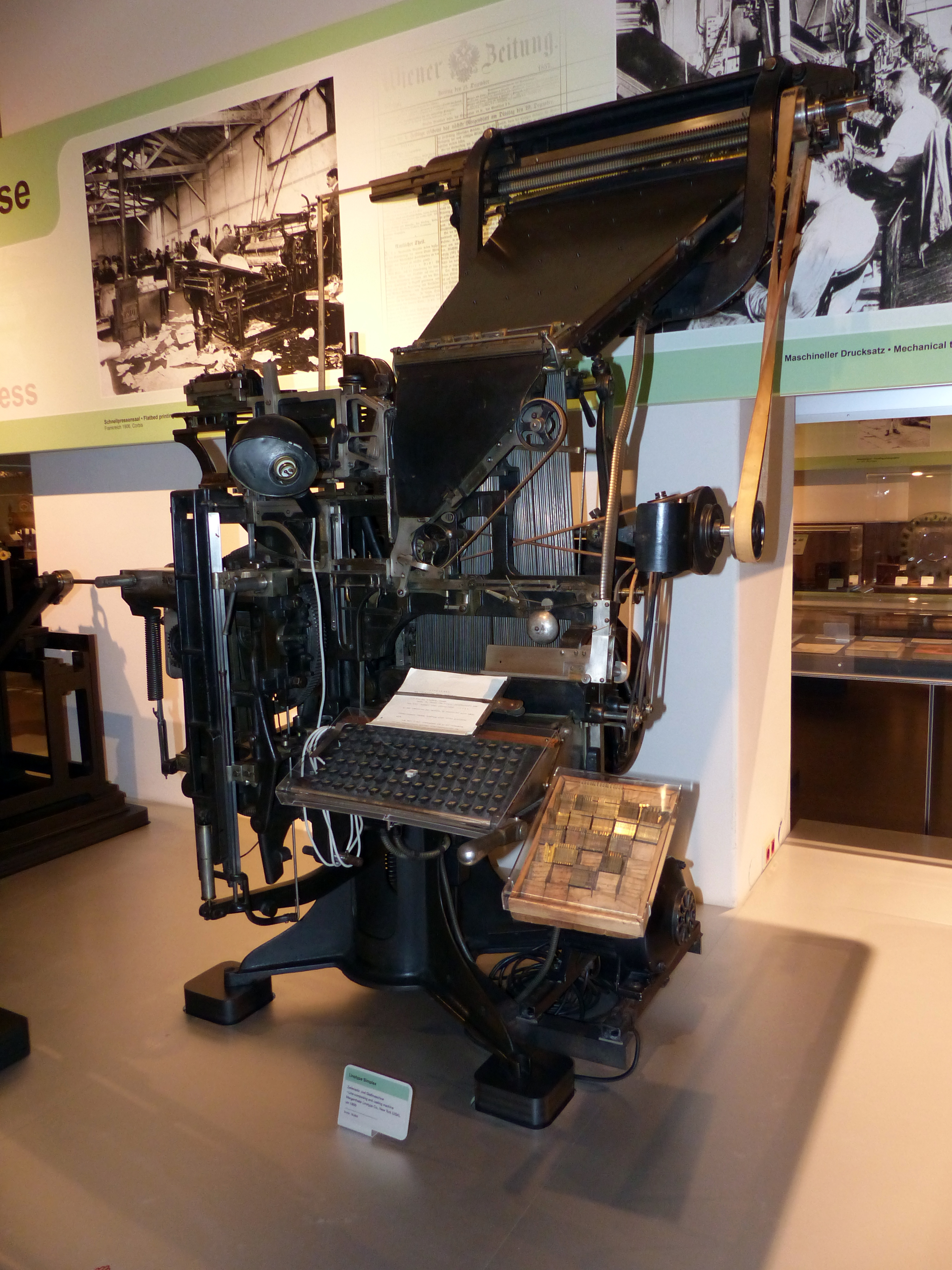
Linotype Simplex 1895
