= Charlton Manor =

Manor in Hertfordshire, England

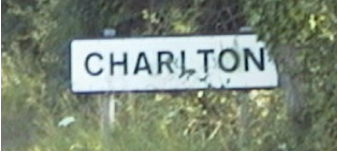

Charlton Manor is an English manor and ancient demesne over 1,000 years old in the county of Hertfordshire in England, approximately 45 minutes north of London, and adjacent to the market town of Hitchin with which it has ancient historical connections. Charlton Manor is recorded in the Hertfordshire County Archives.

Over time the ownership of Charlton Manor, a landed estate, and the title of Lord of the Manor of Charlton, has changed numerous times since coming into being before 1066 and the Norman Conquest. It passed through the hands of Earl Harold Godwinson (who became King Harold II on 6 January 1066 after the death of Edward the Confessor), William the Conqueror (King William I, Duke of Normandy), and various Priors and heads of the Knights Templar before they were disbanded. This was followed by ownership by the Knights of the Hospital of St. John of Jerusalem (Knights Hospitallers) before they were in turn disbanded causing ownership to pass to King Henry VIII as part of the Dissolution of the monasteries. From then Charlton Manor and the Lordship of Charlton descended with Hitchin Priory under the initial ownership of Ralph Radcliffe.

Over the following four centuries the lordship of the Manor of Charlton passed as part of Hitchin Priory through various members of the Radcliffe and Delmé-Radcliffe family. In 1925 Sir Ralph Delmé-Radcliffe was noted as Lord of the Manor in the Manorial Documents Register of the Royal Commission on Historical Manuscripts in London. When he died in 1963 the Lordship passed to his daughter Anne who subsequently sold Hitchin Priory. The Lordship was then passed by Anne to Peter Havart-Simkin, a British citizen currently residing in California in the United States, who now holds this ancient title.

== Charlton Manor, William the Conqueror and Domesday Book ==
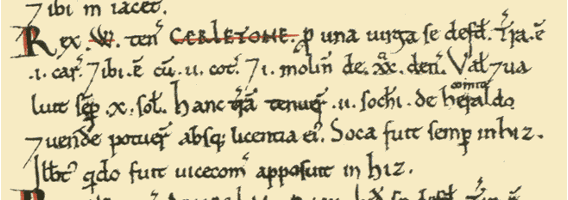
Domesday book

The Manor of Charlton dates to well before William the Conqueror and the conquest of England in 1066 and is referenced in Domesday Book of 1086 as Cerletone (see illustration) later to become known as Charlton. There is also a reference and translation as part of the Open Domesday project.

Prior to William the Conqueror, Charlton Manor was owned by Earl Harold (and in 1066 by him as Harold II the last Anglo-Saxon king of England) as Overlord of the manor with the Lordship held by two of Harold's sokemen. Earl Harold controlled some 16 Hertfordshire manors in the Hundred of Hitchin (which consisted of 20 different towns and villages including Charlton).

The Manor of Hitchin was the head of the group held by Earl Harold, to which King William succeeded after the Conquest. Prior to 1066 Earl Harold, the son of the Earl of Wessex and brother-in-law of King Edward the Confessor, was a landowner associated with 719 properties in England. After the conquest, King William owned all the lands previously owned by Harold and was associated with 2,360 properties in England.

William granted the Manor of Hitchin to Ilbert, Sheriff of Hertfordshire (who was also the High Sheriff of Essex, on behalf of the crown as a Royal Manor. Subsequently, the manors of King's Walden, Charlton and Offley were formally attached to the Manor of Hitchin by Ilbert. Hence the Lord of the Manor of Charlton was formally connected with the Manor of Hitchin. In 1086 King William was both the Tenant-in-Chief of the Manor of Charlton and the Lord of the Manor of Charlton.

== Charlton Manor from the Knights Templar to Henry VIII ==
Hertfordshire was a focal point for the Knights Templar in England. The Manor of Dinsley, which was formerly part of the Manor of Hitchin was given to the Knights Templar in the 12th century after a chapter of the Order of the Temple meeting in Paris in 1147. The Templars built a preceptory on the site – which was renamed or known as Temple Dinsley.

The property of the Knights Templar was increased by gifts from benefactors. Among the larger gifts was land in Charlton which was donated in 1244-5 by Maud de Lovetot. As such, the Manor of Charlton became even more closely associated with and controlled by the Knights Templar, and the Lordship of the Manor of Charlton was vested in the Knights Templar. The Knights Templar were granted free warren in their demesne lands of Dinsley, Preston, Charlton, King's Walden and Hitchin in January 1253 by Henry III.

Charlton Manor and the Lordship of Charlton Manor were in the hands of the Knights Templar until the suppression of the order in 1307. Between 13 October 1307 and 8 January 1308, the Templars went largely unmolested in England. The majority were never arrested but the damage was done. The order was officially disbanded in 1312 by Pope Clement V.

The Knights Hospitallers of St. John took over where the Knights Templar left off – they were, to some degree, a continuation of the Templar ideals and practices. They became the owners of the manors of Dinsley, Preston, Charlton, Walden and Hitchin by virtue of the Statute of 1324, and eventually placed members of their order there. As a result, the Lordship of the Manor of Charlton was in the hands of the Knights Hospitallers of St. John until almost all the property of the Knights Hospitallers was confiscated by King Henry VIII during the Dissolution of the Monasteries in the Reformation. Though not formally suppressed, this caused the activities of the English arm of the order to come to an end in 1542.

The dissolution of the monasteries was executed between 1536 and 1541. During this period, Henry VIII disbanded monasteries, priories, convents, and friaries expropriating their income, and disposing of their assets. As such, for several years, the Manor of Charlton along with the Lordship of the Manor of Charlton rested with King Henry VIII. The connection of the Manor of Charlton with the Knights Templar and Knights Hospitallers is perpetuated by the names Temple Hedges and Spitalfields.

== Charlton Manor after Henry VIII ==
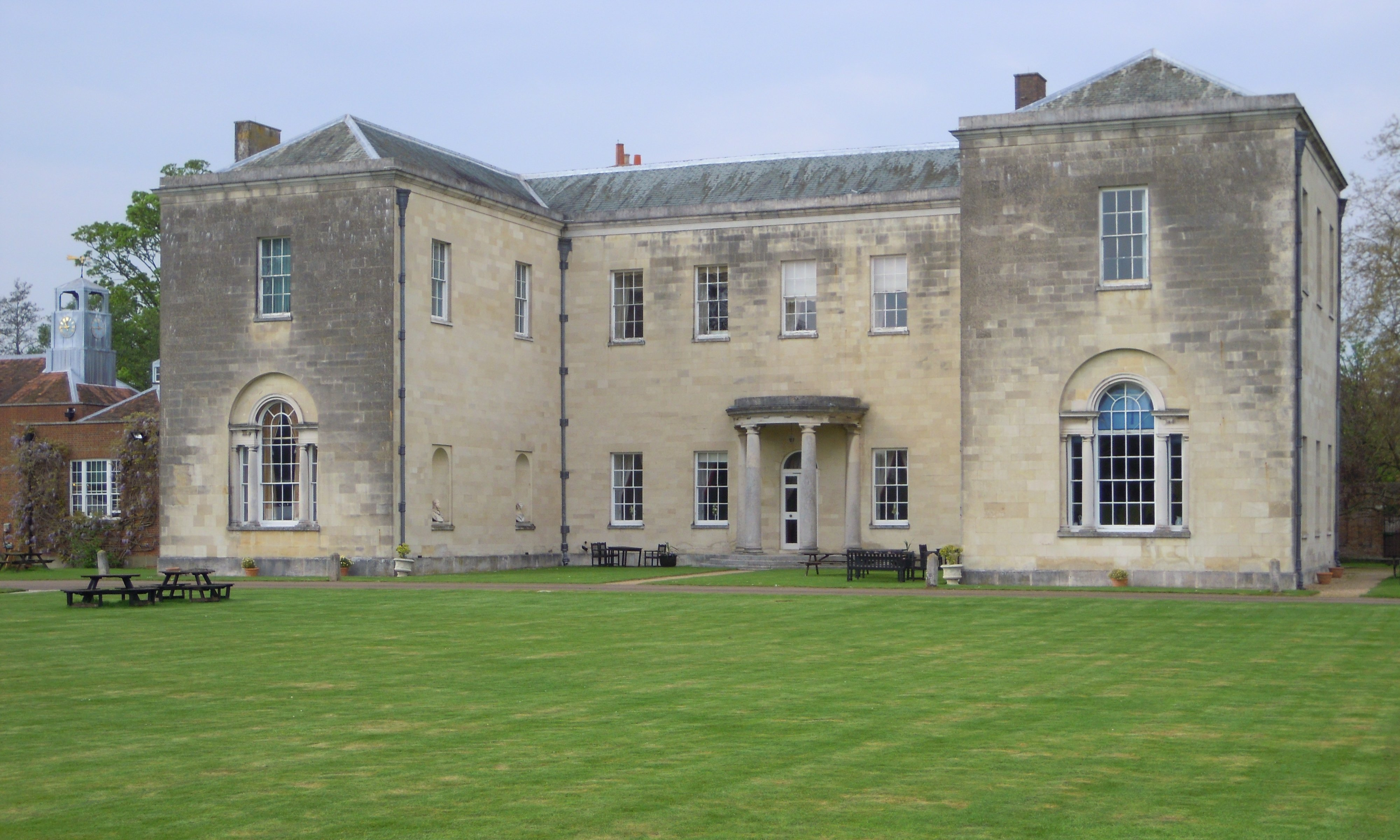
Hitchin Priory

The subsequent history of Charlton Manor begins two centuries earlier when in 1317, Edward II granted to the Carmelite Friars a principal dwelling in the Manor of Hitchin where they could build a church and house for their habitation. Later, in 1351, other dwellings and lands were given to them by John de Cobham, 2nd Baron Cobham. The Carmelite Friars constructed a small convent on their new property which was dedicated to the Virgin Mary. This became Hitchin Priory which was subsequently seized and partly destroyed during the Dissolution of the Monasteries.

The Prior of Hitchin Priory was required to take the Oath of Supremacy in 1534 and surrendered Hitchin Priory to the crown on the 17 October 1538. The King's Commissioners took possession on behalf of Henry VIII in 1539. During that time, the Lordship of Charlton and the Manor of Charlton, along with all the lands formerly owned by the Knights Templar and Knights Hospitallers, and the Manor of Hitchin and its sub-manors, all passed into the ownership of Henry VIII. None remained in his possession for very long as eventually they all passed into or were sold into private hands.

Hitchin Priory passed into the hands of Sir Edward Watson and Henry Herdsen to whom it was sold by the Crown on 28 July 1546. They in turn immediately conveyed it to Ralph Radcliffe that year. The date of acquisition aligns with the inscription on Ralph's memorial in St. Mary's church in Hitchin which indicates that Ralph bought Hitchin Priory in 1546 – 14 years before his death in 1559.

At around the same time, Edward Pulter acquired Charlton Manor from the Crown it previously having belonged to the Knights Hospitalers. Little is known about Edward Pulter although it is known that the Pulter family came to Hitchin in around 1400. They have family buried in Hitchin church (John in 1421 and his wife Lucia in 1420). Edward Pulter sold Charlton Manor to Ralph Radcliffe, the son of Ralph the original purchaser of Hitchin Priory who died in 1559, on 12 November 1582.

From that date the Manor of Charlton, the Lordship of Charlton and Hitchin Priory have descended with the Radcliffe and Delmé-Radcliffe family up until the sale of Hitchin Priory in 1964.

== The Lords of the Manor of Charlton – the Radcliffe years ==
The Radcliffe's of Hitchin Priory are a branch of the very ancient and distinguished family of Radclyffe of the county of Lancaster. Over time the Radcliffe family grew to become a very prominent family in Hitchin and Charlton. They have a significant presence in Hitchin church. The south chapel contains a large 17th-century monument to Ralph Radcliffe (1559), Ralph Radcliffe (1621), Sir Edward Radcliffe (1631), and Edward Radcliffe (1660), as well as other monuments to other members of the same family.

Over the next four centuries, the Radcliffe and Delmé-Radcliffe family were owners of Hitchin Priory and the holders of the Lordship of the Manor of Charlton. The history and the greater part of the Delmé-Radcliffe archives was deposited in the Hertfordshire County Records Office in January 1949.

Ralph Radcliffe (1519 – 1559), the younger son of Thomas Radcliffe of Lancashire and a cousin of the Earl of Sussex, was a noted schoolmaster and playwright. He was the first Radcliffe owner of Hitchin Priory, Charlton Manor, and the Lordship of Charlton. Educated at the University of Oxford he was one of the earliest undergraduates of the newly founded Brasenose College. He also attended the University of Cambridge where he graduated with a B.A. in 1536–37 and then an M.A. in 1539. Ralph's son Edward became physician to James I and was knighted by him. Ralph bequeathed his estates to his oldest son, also named Ralph Radcliffe (1543 – 1621) who, upon his own death, bequeathed them to his nephew Sir Edward Radcliffe (1590 – 1660). Upon Sir Edward's death, Edward's nephew Ralph inherited the estates.

Sir Ralph Radcliffe (1633 – 1720), who was knighted on the 18 February 1667, inherited the Priory in 1660. He created the Radcliffe family business in the Levant trade. This made a second significant fortune for the family. On his death in 1720 his son Edward inherited.

Edward Radcliffe (1658 – 1727) inherited Hitchin Priory late in his life, along with substantial sums in stock in the South Sea and East India companies, in addition to the stake in the Levant Company trade. On Edward's death in 1727 his son Ralph Radcliffe inherited. Ralph proceeded to use the profits from the Levant business to enhance the Hitchin Priory estate. On his death in 1739 Ralph passed the estate, the manor and the Lordship to his nephew John.

John Radcliffe (1738 – 1783) was an Eton College educated politician who sat in the British House of Commons from 1768 to 1783. He successfully held the seat as MP for St Albans from 1768 until his death.

Frederick Peter Delmé-Radcliffe (1804 – 1875) was a former captain in the Grenadier Guards. He was Master of the Hertfordshire Hounds and wrote a well-known book about fox hunting published in 1839 titled The Noble Science: A Few General ideas on Fox Hunting. On Frederick's death in 1875, he passed his estates to his son Hubert Delmé-Radcliffe (1839 – 1878). On Hubert's death, Francis Augustus John Delmé-Radcliffe JP inherited Hitchin Priory and the Lordship of the Manor of Charlton. He was a retired commander (or commodore) in the Royal Navy. On his death in 1916 Hitchin Priory and the Lordship of the Manor of Charlton passed to his nephew Ralph.

Sir Ralph Hubert John Delmé-Radcliffe (1877 – 1963), educated at Eton, was the son of Reverend Arthur Delmé-Radcliffe and his wife Beatrice daughter of F. Dudley Ryder and granddaughter of Dudley Ryder, 1st Earl of Harrowby. Sir Ralph was a clerk in the House of Commons of the United Kingdom and was a captain in the 12th Battery of the London Regiment. Sir Ralph was recorded as the Lord of Manor in the Manorial Documents Register in 1925. On his death in 1963, Hitchin Priory, Charlton Manor and the Lordship of Charlton Manor passed to his daughter Anne Melicent Delmé-Radcliffe (b 1941).

Anne inherited both Hitchin Priory and the Lordship of the Manor of Charlton. She was married firstly to Sir John Bruce Woollacott Ropner, 2nd Baronet of the Ropner baronets, (died 2016) and secondly to Richard Ernest de Courcy Beamish. Anne sold the Hitchin Priory to Hertfordshire County Council in 1964 thus ending her family's association which had continued for more than 400 years.

== Hitchin Priory - the post-Radcliffe years ==
After being sold, Hitchin Priory was used by the Hertfordshire County Education Department as a centre for residential courses. In 1984 the building was converted into offices and subsequently to a hotel. It has been a Grade I listed building on the Register of Historic England since 1951.

== The present day Lord of Charlton ==
Anne Delmé-Radcliffe passed the Lordship of the Manor of Charlton to the current holder of the title Peter Radcliffe Havart-Simkin (b. 1952), a British citizen currently residing in California, United States, with his wife Lucinda. Peter Havart-Simkin is a serial entrepreneur having worked in the IT industry for more than 40 years and founding several technology companies.

== Sir Henry Bessemer – born in Charlton ==
Sir Henry Bessemer FRS (19 January 1813 – 15 March 1898), was born in Charlton House in Charlton and was an English engineer and inventor. His steel-making process would become the most important technique for making steel in the 19th century and for almost one hundred years from 1856 to 1950.
