= Anthony Bessemer =

British engineer and industrialist

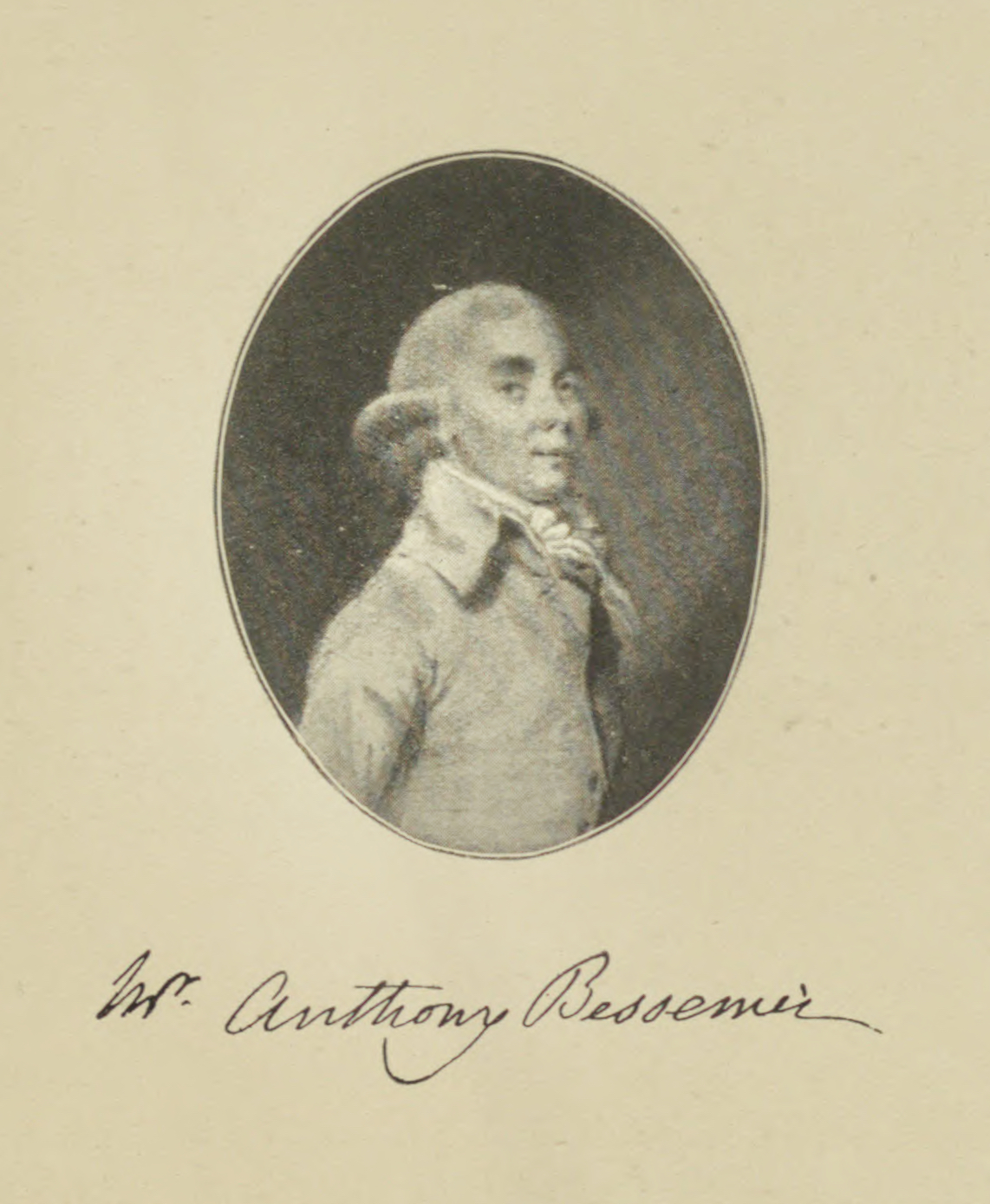
Anthony Bessemer

Anthony Bessemer (1766–1836 or after 1840) was a British industrialist and punchcutter, who spent large portions of his life in the Netherlands and France before returning to live in London and Hertfordshire. His son was Sir Henry Bessemer, the inventor of the Bessemer process for steel manufacture.

== Early life ==
Born in 1766 at No. 6 Old Broad Street in London, Bessemer moved to the Netherlands as a boy with his family and lived there from 1777 to 1787, then moving to Paris. As an engineer his work included draining machinery and microscope manufacture. With the upheaval of the French Revolution he returned to London.

== Career ==
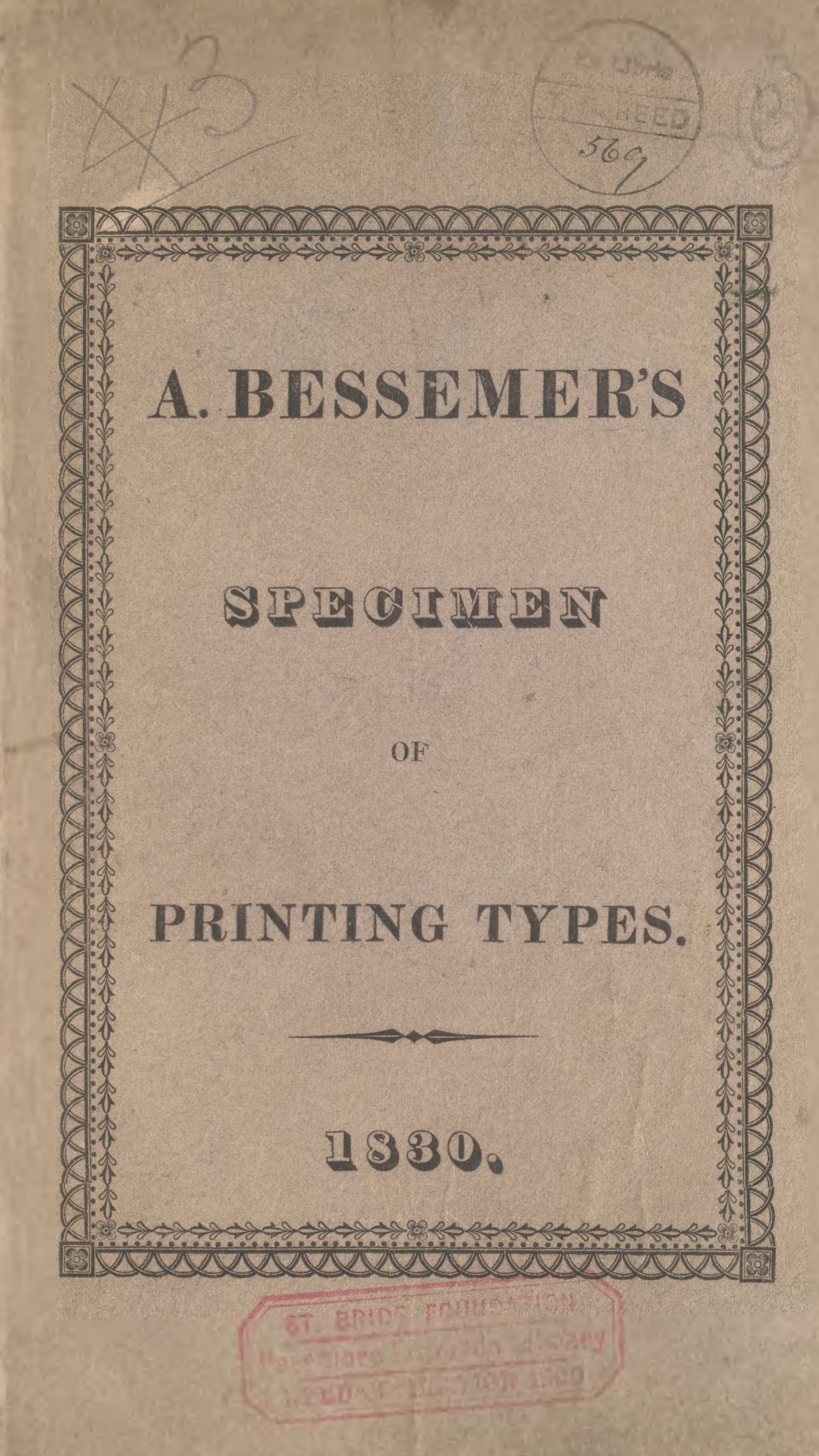
The cover of the 1830 specimen of Bessemer's type foundry

Bessemer acted as a punchcutter, an engraver of metal type, first for type foundries on the continent, then on returning to England for Henry Caslon (who was Henry Bessemer's godfather and namesake) and later for his own type foundry; according to Jeans his clients on the continent included the firm of Firmin Didot, and he also sold a font to the Enschedé foundry in 1795. In the course of his work for Caslon he testified by letter to the London Society of Arts in May 1818 on the topic of new anti-forgery precautions on banknotes, and this provides testimony on his work rate for the specific case of cutting 4pt punches: "the time required to engrave a diamond lower case alphabet and doubles, consisting of 33 punches, would be about six weeks, and that the same time would be required for a set of capitals of 28 punches." Caslon testified that "at present there are only four or five persons in England who can execute diamond [4pt] type". (Note: Bessemer is mentioned in Hansard's Typographia using this spelling, but the cutting of a diamond-size font for Caslon is credited to a Mr Bessimer, who is listed separately in the index. Reed (1887) concluded that this was a misprint and that the two were likely one and the same. Caslon explicitly credited the cutting of his diamond type to Bessemer.)

Some years after returning to England, he set up a type foundry in Charlton, Hertfordshire with his business partner J.J. Catherwood (a former business partner of Caslon's), which later moved to London.

Bessemer's son Henry was born while he lived in Charlton in 1813. Henry Bessemer took an early interest in his father's business and some of his early patents are for improved type-casting machinery. Bessemer auctioned his foundry in 1832. (Note: Reed had access to a sale catalogue, which unfortunately is no longer known to survive.) It had been assumed that he retired at this point; however Brazilian historian Orlando da Costa Ferreira proposed in the 1970s that Bessemer was the type-founder invited by the Brazilian government to set up a type foundry, who arrived there in October 1837. The project proved uneconomical: the government paid the founder compensation in October 1840 and he left in November, the year before his four-year contract was due to expire. Edna Lucia Cunha Lima, however, doubts that Bessemer is the type-founder in question, noting that Bessemer was quite elderly at this time and that the typefounder apparently required an interpreter to help understand French, something unlikely to be necessary for Bessemer who had lived in France.

His specimen of 1830 has been reprinted by the British Printing Historical Society and digitised.

== Sources ==
- Bessemer, Henry (1905). Sir Henry Bessemer, F.R.S.: an autobiography; with a concluding chapter. London: Engineering.
- "A Bessemer Steel Rail". Locomotive Firemen's Magazine. 19 (1). B of LF&E: 3–12. 1895.
- Burton, Anthony (2015). The Iron Men: The Workers Who Created the New Iron Age. History Press. ISBN 978-0750959551.
- De Vinne, Theodore Low (1899). The Practice of Typography: A Treatise on the Processes of Type-making, the Point System, the Names, Sizes, Styles, and Prices of Plain Printing Types. Century. p. 101.
- Gray, Nicolete (1938). XIXth Century Ornamented Types and Title Pages. London: Faber & Faber. p. 114.
- Hansard, Thomas Curson (1825). Typographia, an Historical Sketch of the Origin and Progress of the Art of Printing.
- Hendrickson, Kenneth E (2014). The Encyclopedia of the Industrial Revolution in World History. Rowman & Littlefield. ISBN 978-0810888876.
- Jeans, William T (1884). The creators of the age of steel. Chapman and Hall.
- Lee, Sir Sidney (1901). Dictionary of National Biography: Supplement. Smith, Elder. p. 185.
- Nash, Paul W (2004). "Hansard's typographical banknote". Journal of the Printing Historical Society.
- Reed, Talbot Baines (1887). A History of the Old English Letter Foundries: With Notes, Historical and Bibliographical, on the Rise and Progress of English Typography. London: Elliot Stock. pp. 358–359.
- Wolpe, Berthold (1967). Vincent Figgins: Type specimens, 1801 and 1815. London: Printing Historical Society.
