= Charlton, Hertfordshire =

Hamlet in Hertfordshire, England

Coordinates: 51.937770°N 0.287961°W

Charlton
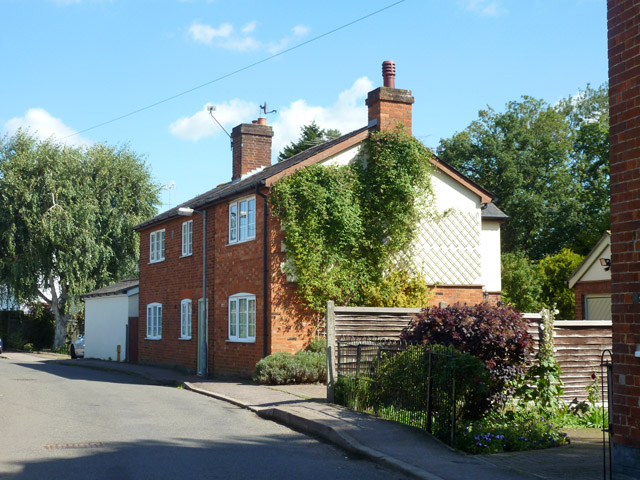
- Charlton Road

- Location within Hertfordshire
- Population: 50 (2020 estimate)
- OS grid reference: TL178280
  - London: 30 mi (48 km)
- Shire county: Hertfordshire
- Region: East
- Country: England
- Sovereign state: United Kingdom
- Post town: HITCHIN
- Postcode district: SG5
- Dialling code: 01462
- UK Parliament: Hitchin

Charlton is a hamlet in the county of Hertfordshire, in the East of England. It is a component hamlet of the market town of Hitchin, forming a part of the Hitchin Priory ward. Its rural character is protected as a Conservation Area. Situated east of the Chilterns AONB, it lies 30 miles north of London.

== History ==
The manor of Charlton is mentioned in the Domesday Book as belonging to Ilbert of Hitchin. It later came into the possession of the Knights Templar, and then by the Knights Hospitaller with the manor of Temple Dinsley until the suppression of the latter order. The manor subsequently came to Edward Pulter, who sold it in 1582 to Ralph Radcliffe from which time it was part of the property of Hitchin Priory.

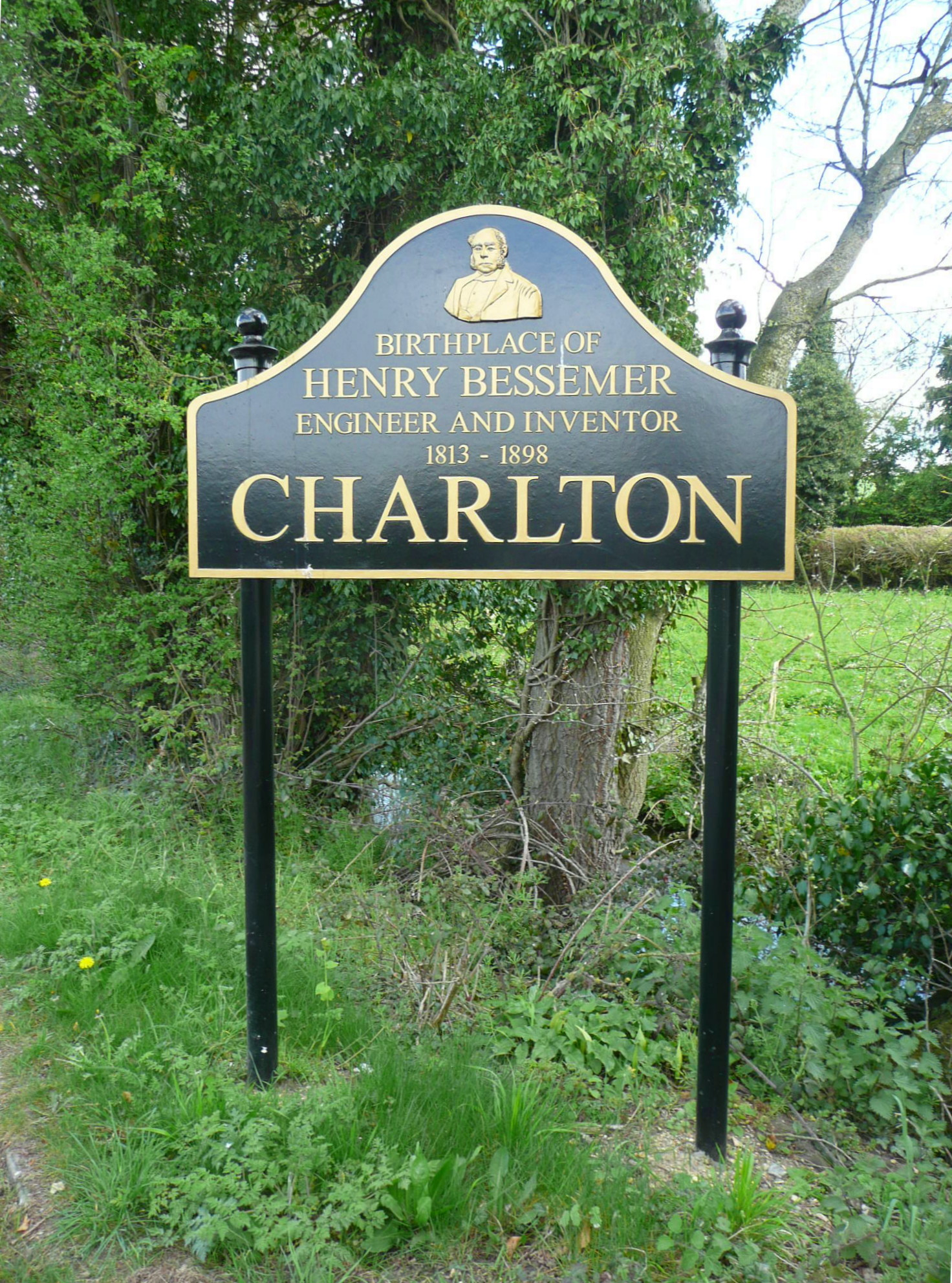
Sign advertising Charlton as Henry Bessemer's birthplace

Charlton House is a Grade II listed building and the birthplace of inventor Henry Bessemer in 1813. At the time his father, Anthony Bessemer, operated a type foundry in the village. The mill-wheel was adapted by his grandfather to power a small foundry. The water-mill was therefore converted to a foundry during the occupancy of the Bessemer family and back to a mill again afterwards. There are remains of a windmill less than half a mile from the Windmill pub from which it may have taken its name. There was, until the 1970s, also a water-wheel in the mill-race in the yard of Wellhead Farm.

According to an article by Peter Harkness in Vol 1, No 1 of "Old Hitchin Life" the Harkness family's now world-famous rose-nursery was, in the late 19th century, based in Charlton as well as Bedale, in Yorkshire, with Robert Harkness moving into Charlton House (Bessemer's birthplace) in 1895.
