= Henry Bessemer =

English inventor (1813–1898)

Sir Henry Bessemer FRS
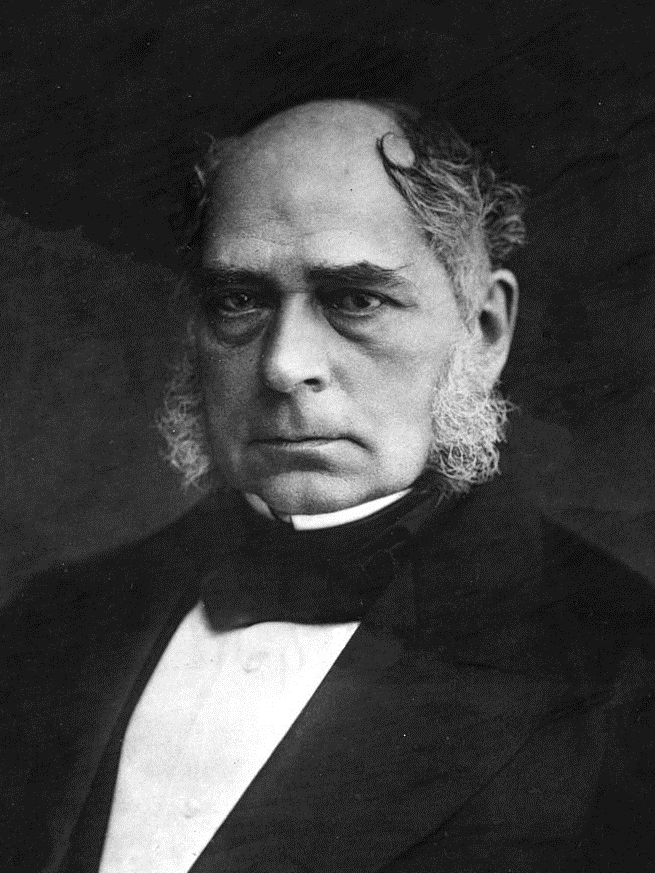
- Bessemer c. 1890s
- Born: Henry Bessemer; 19 January 1813; Charlton, Hertfordshire, England
- Died: 15 March 1898 (aged 85); London, England
- Occupations: Engineer and inventor
- Known for: Development of the Bessemer process for the manufacture of steel
- Awards: Albert Medal (1872)

Signature
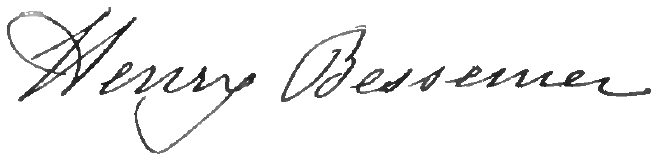

Sir Henry Bessemer (19 January 1813 – 15 March 1898) was an English inventor, whose steel-making process was the most important technique for making steel in the nineteenth century for almost one hundred years. He played a significant role in establishing the town of Sheffield, nicknamed ‘Steel City’, as a major industrial center.

Bessemer had been trying to reduce the cost of steel-making for military ordnance, and developed his system for blowing air through molten pig iron to remove the impurities. This made steel easier, quicker and cheaper to manufacture, and revolutionized structural engineering. One of the most significant inventors of the Second Industrial Revolution, Bessemer made at least 128 inventions in the fields of iron, steel and glass. Unlike many inventors, he brought his own projects to fruition and profited financially from their success. In 1879, he was knighted for his contribution to science and was elected a fellow of the Royal Society.

== Early Life and Career ==
Henry Bessemer was born in 1813 in Charlton, a village in England. According to Bessemer himself, he was given his name by his godfather Henry Caslon, who employed his father as a punchcutter. Anthony Bessemer, his father, had been an inventor in Paris, escaping to Britain during the French Revolution. Once in Britain, Anthony managed to restore his wealth, enabling him to buy a small estate. As such, Henry Bessemer was not required to work during his childhood, instead receiving an education and assisting in the family business of type casting. In his early life, Henry had focused on growing his skills of invention. This was encouraged by his parents, who provided him with a lathe to practice turning. When he was 17, Bessemer moved to London alongside his family's business, with his first jobs involving various printing and metallurgical tasks. Here, he made his first commercially successful invention, a die made of a special type of metal able to produce fine detail.

== Early inventions ==
Bessemer made his first fortune with a series of six steam-powered machines for making bronze powder, used in the manufacture of gold paint. He was spurred to investigate this technology upon realizing that an equivalent weight of bronze powder cost far more than the raw material itself did. At the time, bronze powder was only made in Nuremberg. Bessemer examined the Nuremberg bronze powder then copied and improved the product such that it could be produced on a production line. It was an early example of reverse engineering.

The process was kept secret with only members of his immediate family having access to the factory. The hand-made Nuremberg powder retailed in London for £5 12 shillings (£5.60p) per pound; he reduced the price to £ – 2 / 6 (£0.12p). The profits from the paint allowed him to pursue his other inventions.

Bessemer patented a method for making a continuous ribbon of plate glass in 1848, but it was not commercially successful ( chapter 8). He gained experience in designing furnaces, which was of use for his new steel-making process.

== Bessemer process ==
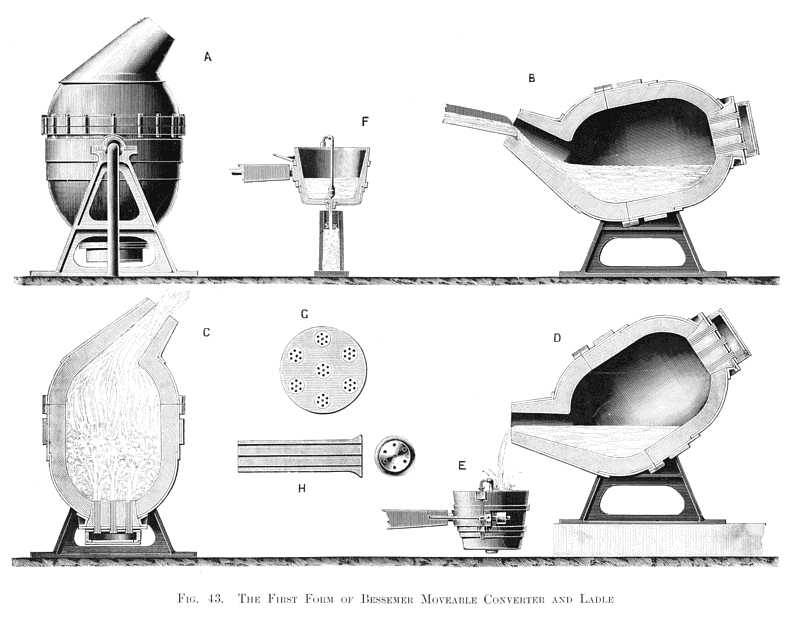
Bessemer converter

Henry Bessemer's attention was drawn to the problem of steel manufacture in the course of an attempt to improve the construction of guns. While trialing his smoothbore spinning projectiles, Bessemer had received feedback from Claude Etienne Minie. Minie had been hesitant to use the new projectiles in existing cast-iron guns. This was due to the high weight of the projectile, which caused more stress on the guns than standard shot. After Minie asked Bessemer if newer guns could be made to withstand this higher stress, Bessemer turned his attention to the materials the guns could be made of. Bessemer worked on the problem of manufacturing cheap steel for ordnance production from 1850 to 1855 when he patented his method. During this time, Bessemer was guided by the idea that iron could be refined using air alone, after accidentally observing pig iron being converted to malleable iron through exposure to air in his furnace. However, William Kelly, an American inventor in Kentucky, received a priority patent in 1857, effectively nullifying Bessemer's 1855 US patent.

By 1856, Bessemer had refined his design enough for publication. On August 24th of that year, Bessemer first described the process to a meeting of the British Association in Cheltenham which he titled "The Manufacture of Malleable Iron and Steel without Fuel." It was published in full in The Times. The Bessemer process involved using oxygen in air blown through molten pig iron to burn off the impurities and thus create steel. James Nasmyth had been working on a similar idea for some time prior to this. A reluctant patentor, and in this instance still working through some problems in his method, Nasmyth abandoned the project after hearing Bessemer at the meeting. Bessemer acknowledged the efforts of Nasmyth by offering him a one-third share of the value of his patent. Nasmyth turned it down as he was about to retire.

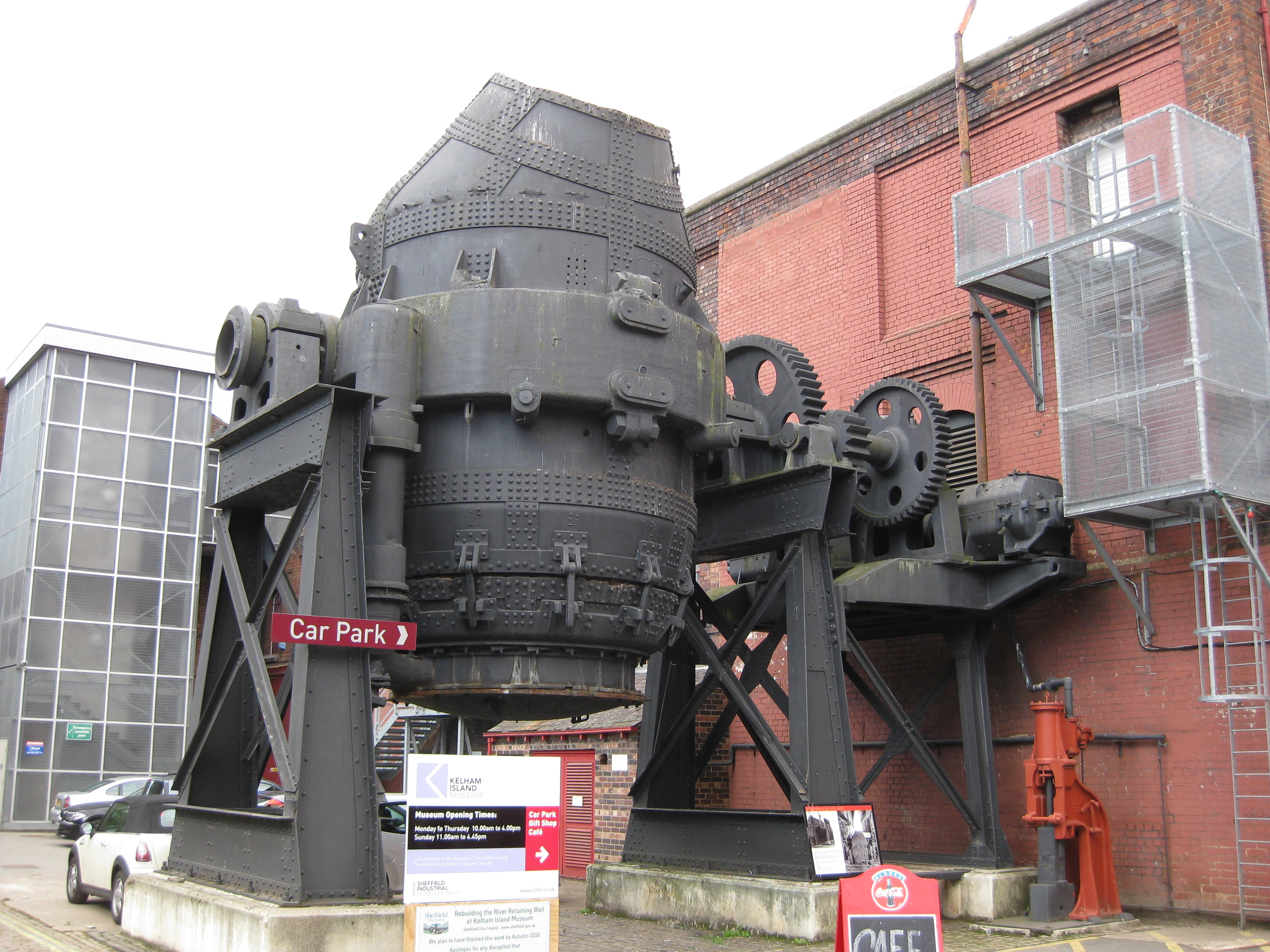
Bessemer converter, Kelham Island Museum, Sheffield, England in 2010

Many industries were constrained by the lack of steel, being reliant on cast iron and wrought iron alone. Examples include railway structures such as bridges and tracks, where the treacherous nature of cast iron was keenly felt by many engineers and designers. There had been many accidents when cast iron beams collapsed suddenly, such as the Dee Bridge disaster of May 1847, the Wootton bridge collapse and the Bull bridge accident of 1860. The problem recurred at the Tay Bridge disaster of 1879, and failures continued until all cast iron under-bridges were replaced by steel structures. Wrought iron structures were much more reliable with very few failures.

Though this process is no longer commercially used, at the time of its invention it was of enormous industrial importance because it lowered the cost of production steel, leading to steel being widely substituted for cast iron and wrought iron.

=== Implementation ===
Bessemer licensed the patent for his process to five ironmasters, but from the outset, the companies had great difficulty producing good-quality steel. Mr. Göran Fredrik Göransson, a Swedish ironmaster, using the purer charcoal pig iron of that country, was the first to make good steel by the process, but only after many attempts. His results prompted Bessemer to try a purer iron obtained from Cumberland hematite, but even with this he had only limited success because the quantity of carbon was difficult to control. Robert Forester Mushet had carried out thousands of experiments at Darkhill Ironworks, in the Forest of Dean, and had shown that the quantity of carbon could be controlled by removing almost all of it from the iron and then adding an exact amount of carbon and manganese, in the form of spiegeleisen. This improved the quality of the finished product and increased its malleability.

Bessemer's first efforts to market his invention was met with several difficulties. For many of the ironworks that had licensed the Bessemer process, trial batches of metal proved extremely brittle and therefore unusable. This, coupled with the overall difficulty of implementing the process, led to many companies demanding licensing refunds. Following these failures, Bessemer turned to using the process himself, with the aid of his brothers-in-law and machinery suppliers. Using the experience and capital gained from his previous business ventures, Bessemer set up his first steel works in Sheffield. His product soon began to garner notoriety, supplying quality steel at prices ₤15-20 less than the competition. Bessemer soon had earned over a million pounds Sterling through licenses of his process, and soon the technology had spread beyond Sheffield, contributing to the end of the town's dominance over British steelmaking.

However Mushet received nothing and by 1866 was destitute and in ill health. In that year his 16-year-old daughter, Mary, travelled to London alone, to confront Bessemer at his offices, arguing that his success was based on the results of her father's work. Bessemer decided to pay Mushet an annual pension of £300, a very considerable sum, which he paid for over 20 years, possibly with a view to keeping the Mushets from legal action.

Bessemer also had works in Greenwich, London, adjacent to the River Thames, from about 1865.

W. M. Lord has said with regard to this success that "Sir Henry Bessemer was somewhat exceptional. He had developed his process from an idea to a practical reality in his own lifetime and he was sufficient a businessman to have profited by it. In so many cases, inventions were not developed quickly and the plums went to other persons than the inventors."

== Other inventions ==
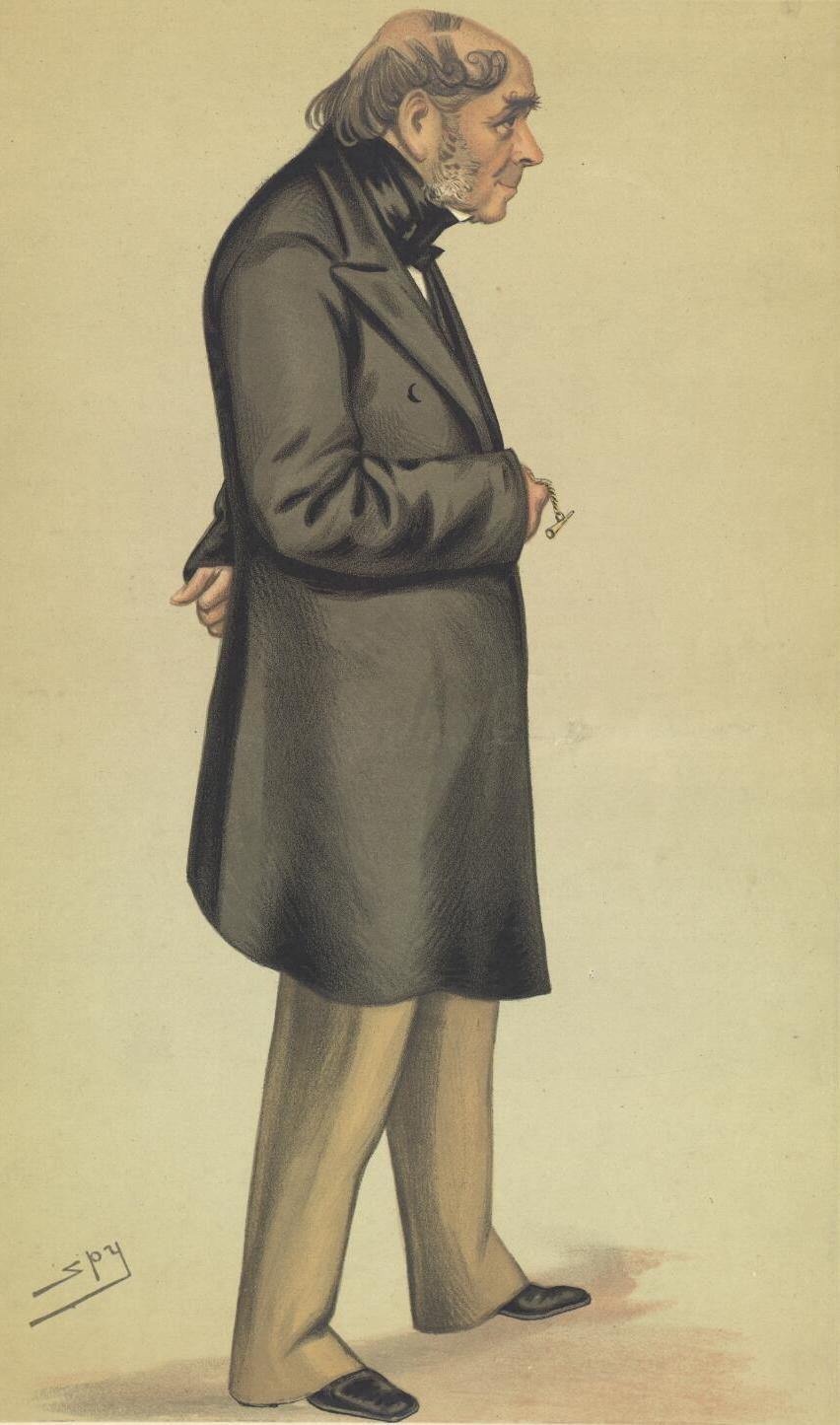
Captioned "Steel", caricature of Bessemer by Leslie Ward in Vanity Fair, 6 November 1880

Bessemer was a prolific inventor and held at least 129 patents, spanning from 1838 to 1883. These included military ordnance, movable dies for embossed postage stamps, a screw extruder to extract sugar from sugar cane, and others in the fields of iron, steel and glass. These are described in some detail in his autobiography.

In 1849 Bessemer set out to provide a solution to common explosions in coal mines and utilized an old patent for a ventilation system. This design was adapted to provide 15,000 cubic feet of air circulation into mines using a low power engine that was easily setup in weeks. While his prototype helped lower mine temperatures it was ultimately not put into use in any real coal mine.

After suffering from seasickness in 1868, he designed the SS Bessemer (also called the "Bessemer Saloon"), a passenger steamship with a cabin on gimbals designed to stay level, however rough the sea, to save her passengers from seasickness. The mechanism – hydraulics controlled by a steersman watching a spirit level – worked in model form and in a trial version built in his garden in Denmark Hill, London. However, it never received a proper seagoing test as, when the ship demolished part of the Calais pier on her maiden voyage, investor confidence was lost and the ship was scrapped. Attempting to solve an issue posed by shipbuilders and the French military, Bessemer developed a material to improve naval cannons.

Faced with the rising tensions leading to the Crimean War in 1853, Bessemer began attempting development of alternative designs for projectiles. He developed an elongated projectile to remove the need of rifling within the barrel and instead rotated due to additional passageway on the projectile. Parts of the gun utilized different irons and steels that were bolted together allowing for lower weight and higher strength where it was needed. This design was rejected by the British government, but later funded by Emperor Napoleon III after Bessemer proposed his concepts. The initial test showed some success but a need for stronger metal held back the design. This need first lead Bessemer into the development of iron manufacturing.

=== Continuous casting ===
Bessemer also obtained a patent in 1857 for the casting of metal between contrarotating rollers – a forerunner of today's continuous casting processes and remarkably, Bessemer's original idea has been implemented in the direct continuous casting of steel strip.

== Death ==
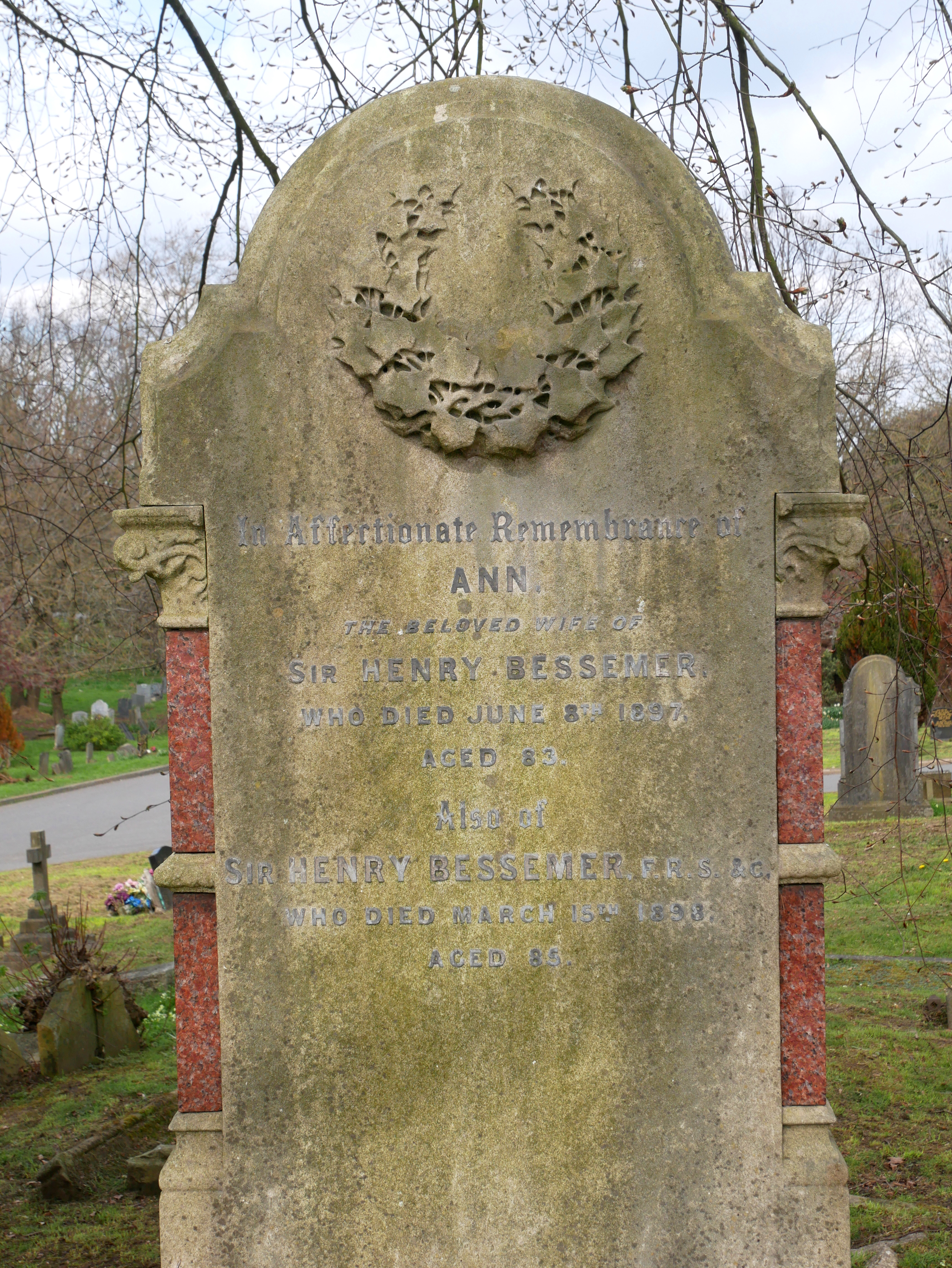
Headstone of Sir Henry Bessemer, West Norwood cemetery

Bessemer died in March 1898 at Denmark Hill, London. He is buried in West Norwood cemetery, London SE27. Other influential Victorians such as Sir Henry Tate, Sir Henry Doulton and Baron de Reuters are buried in the same cemetery.

== Honours and legacy ==
Bessemer was knighted by Queen Victoria for his contribution to science on 26 June 1879, and in the same year was made a fellow of the Royal Society. Honorary memberships were conferred on Bessemer by the Institution of Engineers and Shipbuilders in Scotland and by the American Society of Mechanical Engineers in 1891. He was elected an International Member of the American Philosophical Society in 1894. In 1895, he was elected a Foreign Honorary Member of the American Academy of Arts and Sciences. Sheffield's Kelham Island Industrial Heritage Museum maintains an early example of a Bessemer converter for public viewing.

A school was named after him in the town of Hitchin, and when the school was demolished in the 1980s the new road built in its place was named Bessemer Close in 1995. Bessemer Way in Rotherham is also named in his honour. In 2009, the public house "The Fountain" in Sheffield city centre was renamed "The Bessemer" in homage to Henry Bessemer, who had a huge impact on the Steel City's development. In Workington, Cumbria, the local Wetherspoons pub is now named after him.

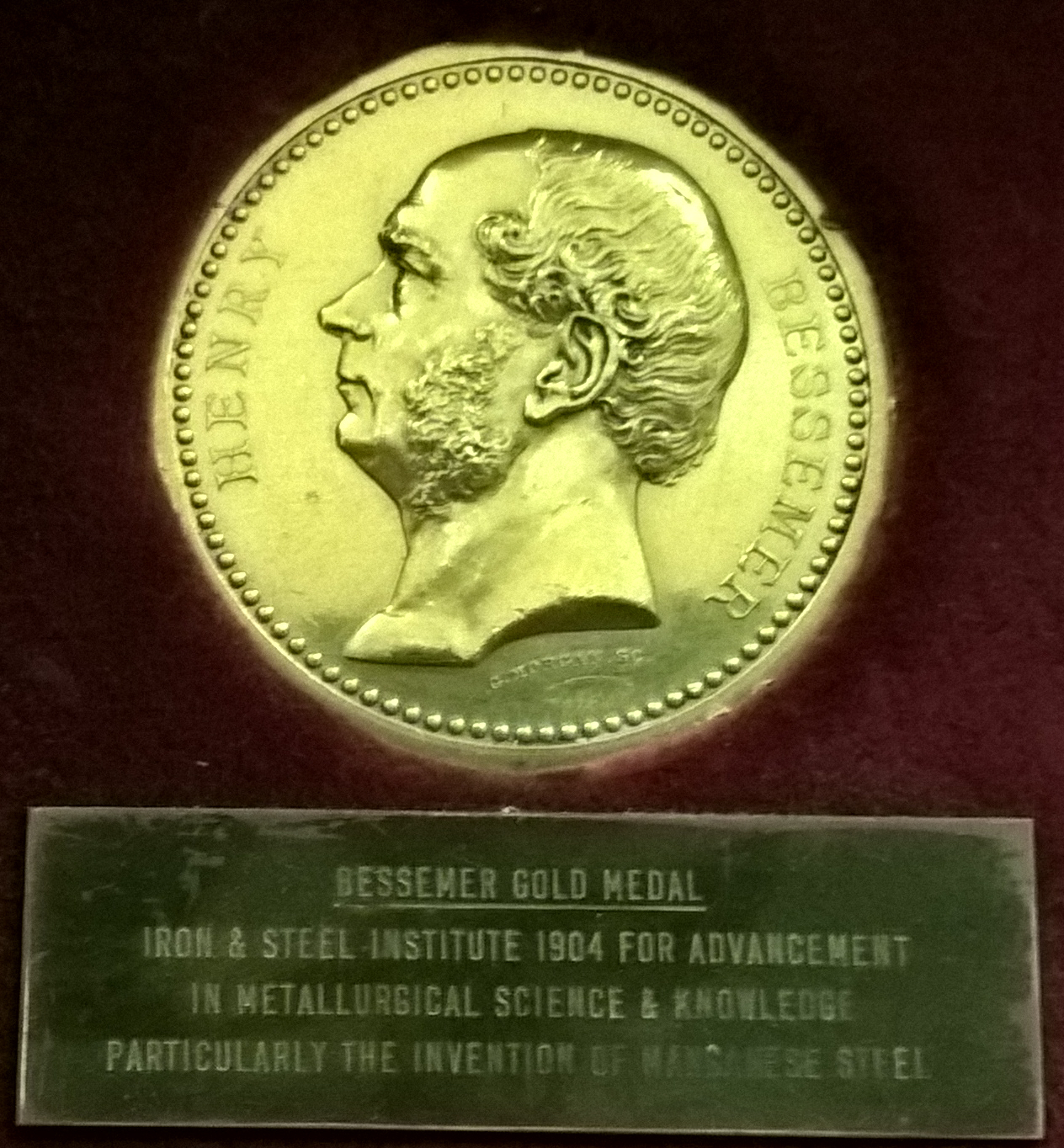
Bessemer Gold Medal from the Iron and Steel Institute

In 2002 the Institute of Materials, Minerals and Mining (IOM3) was established from mergers encompassing historical organisations including the Iron and Steel Institute, of which Bessemer was president from 1871 to 1873; the latter organisation instituted the Bessemer Gold Medal under his tenure. IOM3 still recognises Bessemer's legacy with an annual award of the medal for outstanding services to the steel industry; recent recipients include Indira Samarasekera.

That a man who did so much for industrial development did not receive higher recognition from his own government was a source of deep regret for English engineers, who alluded to the fact that in the United States, where the Bessemer process found much use, eight cities or towns bore his name.

== Sources ==
- Anstis, Ralph (1997). Man of Iron, Man of Steel: Lives of David and Robert Mushet. Albion House. p. 140. ISBN 978-0951137147.
- Bessemer, Henry (1905). Sir Henry Bessemer, F.R.S.: an autobiography; with a concluding chapter. London: Engineering.
- Boylston, Herbert Melville (1936). An introduction to the metallurgy of iron and steel. Wiley.
- Jeans, William T. (1884). The Creators of the Age of Steel. New York: Cambridge University Press. pp. 22–23. ISBN 9780511795459.;
- Lord, W. M. (1945). "The Development of the Bessemer Process in Lancashire, 1856–1900". Transactions of the Newcomen Society. 25: 163–180. doi:10.1179/tns.1945.017.
- Misa, Thomas J. (1995). A Nation of Steel: The Making of Modern America: 1865-1925. Baltimore MD: Johns Hopkins UP. ISBN 978-0801849671.
