= Punchcutting =

Craft used in traditional typography

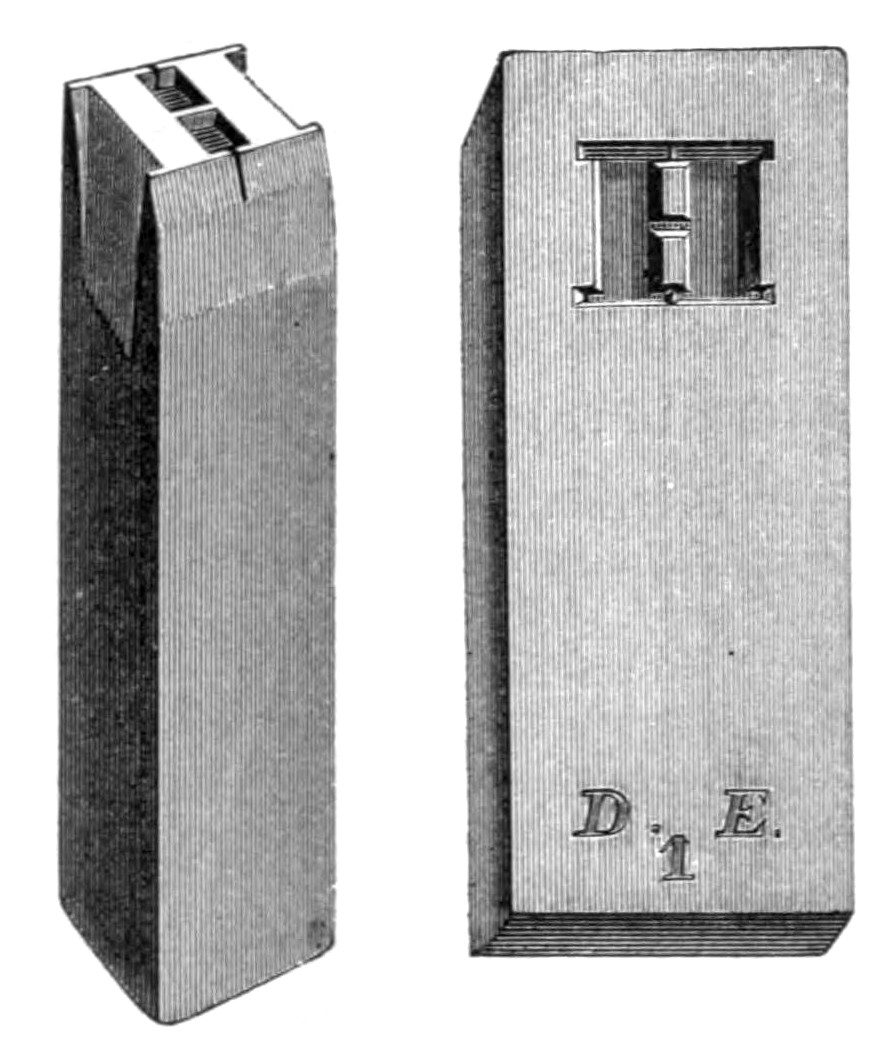
A punch (left) and the respective matrix produced from it (right). The small letters at the base of the matrix are founder's marks.

Punchcutting is a craft used in traditional typography to cut letter punches in steel as the first stage of making metal type. Steel punches in the shape of the letter would be used to stamp matrices into copper, which were locked into a mould shape to cast type. Cutting punches and casting type was the first step of traditional typesetting. The cutting of letter punches was a highly skilled craft requiring much patience and practice. Often the designer of the type would not be personally involved in the cutting.

The initial design for type would be two-dimensional, but a punch has depth, and the three-dimensional shape of the punch, as well as factors such as the angle and depth to which it was driven into the matrix, would affect the appearance of the type on the page. The angle of the side of the punch was particularly significant.

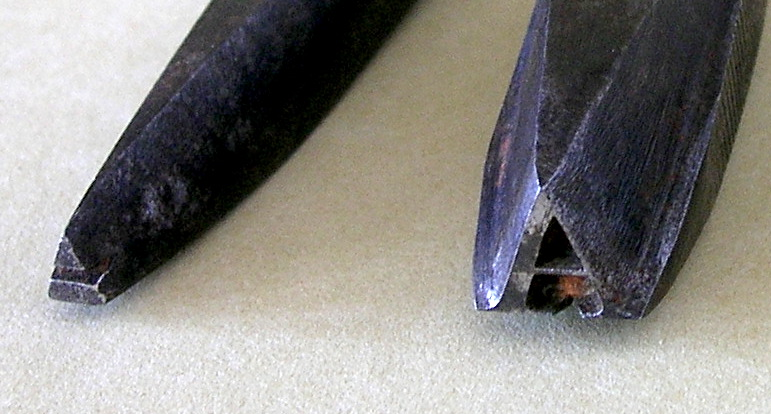
A counter-punch and a punch for letter A

== Process ==
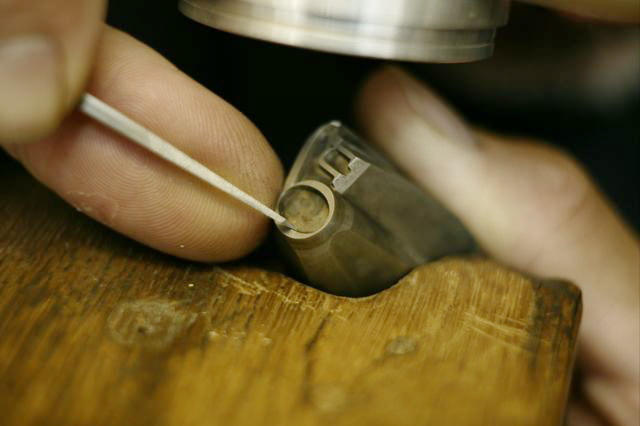
A punchcutter working for the Imprimerie Nationale demonstrates cutting a punch for a Qu ligature.

The punchcutter begins by transferring the outline of a letter design to one end of a steel bar. The outer shape of the punch could be cut directly, but the internal curves of a small punch were particularly difficult as it was necessary to cut deep enough and straight into the metal. While this can be done with cutting tools, a counterpunch, a type of punch used in the cutting of other punches, was often used to create the negative space in or around a glyph. A counterpunch could be used to create this negative space, not just where the space was completely enclosed by the letter, but in any concavity (e.g., above and below the midbar in uppercase "H").

Of course, the counterpunch had to be harder than the punch itself. This was accomplished by annealing (softening) the punch blank, and hardening and tempering the counterpunch. Such a tool solved two issues, one technical and one aesthetic, that arose in punchcutting.

Often the same counterpunch could be used for several letters in a typeface. For example, the negative space inside an uppercase "P" and "R" is usually very similar, and with the use of a counterpunch, they could be nearly identical. Counterpunches were regularly used in this way to give typefaces a more consistent look. The counterpunch would be struck into the face of the punch. The outer form of the letter is then shaped using files.

To test the punch, the punchcutter makes an imprint on a piece of paper after coating the punch with soot from an open flame. The soot left by the flame acts like ink to create an image on the paper (a smoke proof).

Once the punches are ready a mold could then be created from the punch by using the punch on a softer metal (such as copper) to create a matrix. Then, type metal, an alloy of lead, antimony, and tin, flows into the matrix to produce a single piece of type, ready for typesetting.

One characteristic of type metal that makes it valuable for this use is that it expands as it cools (water, silicon and bismuth are other substances that expand on freezing), keeping the accurate dimensions of letters. This characteristic is shared by the bronze used to cast sculptures, but copper-based alloys generally have melting points that are too high to be convenient for typesetting.

Punched matrices were not easy to create for large fonts since it was hard to drive large punches evenly. Alternative methods such as casting type or matrices in sand, plaster or lead were used for these. From the nineteenth century, several new technologies began to appear that displaced manual punchcutting.

== Punchcutters ==
During the early years of printing, during which the craft and tastes were rapidly evolving, printers often cut or commissioned their own punches. Many early printers entered the trade from metalworking and would therefore have had the skills to cut their own types: Johannes Gutenberg came from a metalworking background, as did Nicolas Jenson. As the sale of type evolved into a major, separate trade, punchcutting became a craft principally practiced by the owners or employees of type foundries, or sometimes specialised itinerant craftsmen.

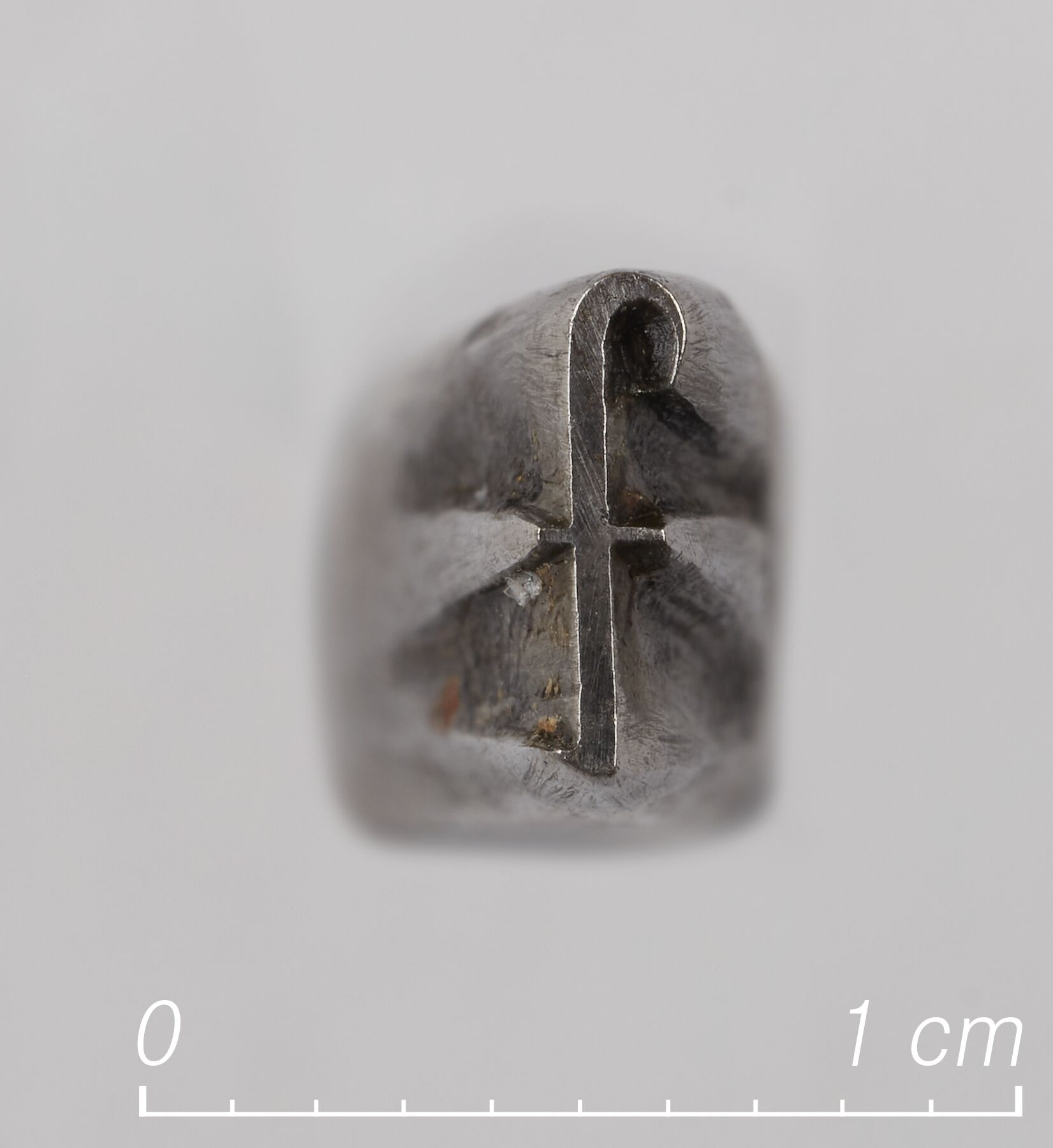
A punch cut by Philippe Danfrie, a maker of mathematical instruments and also a goldsmith. [Lettre françoyse, Philippe Danfrie, steel punch, saint augustin (B1 type), Paris, ante quem 1558, Objet Mandel 194, bibliothèque de l’Arsenal, BnF]

The technique of punchcutting is similar to that used in other precision metalworking professions such as cutting dies to make coins, and many punchcutters entered the trade from these fields: for instance sixteenth-century theologian Jean de Gagny when commissioning types for his private press in the 1540s, hired Charles Chiffin, known to have previously practiced as a goldsmith. Among the most famous punchcutters, Robert Granjon began as the apprentice to a jeweller, although Claude Garamond wrote of cutting type since his childhood. Also Christoffel van Dijck was trained as a goldsmith. In the eighteenth century, William Caslon took up the craft from engraving ornamental designs on firearms and bookbinders' tools. A less common background was that of Miklós Tótfalusi Kis, who began his career as a schoolmaster before paying to learn punchcutting while in the Netherlands to print a Hungarian bible. There was apparently a drop in the number of engravers active in seventeenth-century France compared to the sixteenth, probably due to economic reasons and a saturation of the market with high-quality typefaces cut in the previous century; Pierre-Simon Fournier commented that knowledge of the technique in France degenerated after the sixteenth century to the point that "a man could hardly be found to cut the JJ consonants and UU vowels when the use of them was introduced into France".

The process of punchcutting was apparently sometimes treated as a trade secret due to its difficulty and sometimes passed on from father to son. William Caslon was an example of this, according to Nichols teaching his son his methods privately while locked in a room where nobody could watch them.

Manual punchcutting was a slow process that required expertise. It has been estimated that the work rate of experienced punchcutters was about one letter per day. (Note: The apparent work rate of punchcutter and typefounder Pierre-Simon Fournier in the late eighteenth century, as documented in his specimens, was so rapid that twentieth-century printing historian Harry Carter suggested that he had actually only engraved the characters needed to print his specimens, with the remaining characters filled in later.) Some testimony to the London Society of Arts in May 1818, which was given as part of an inquiry into developing new banknote anti-forgery precautions, illustrates this. Punchcutter Anthony Bessemer gave testimony by letter that his work rate for punches was about 12 weeks (72 days not counting Sundays) to cut a complete set of 61 punches (Note: How Bessemer and Caslon came to a total of 61 is not explained.) around or less than 1 punch per day, for 4pt "diamond"-size type. His employer, Henry II Caslon of the Caslon type foundry elaborated that a font of this size "could scarcely be completed in 7 or 8 months; at present there are only 4 or 5 persons in England who can execute diamond [4pt] type, owing no doubt to the limited demand for it; and the peculiar style of each of these punch cutters is perfectly well known to persons conversant with letter founding." He estimated that a punchcutter could cut two punches of this size a day although more work would be needed to "get type from the punches".

Punchcutters did not necessarily conceive the designs they worked on. Indeed, G. Willem Ovink, a Dutch printing executive and historian of printing, noted in 1973 that he was struck by "the absolute lack of creative talent in all the most skilled punchcutters of this century" with regard to creating their own designs, although presumably many punchcutters of the past designed and conceived the work they engraved.

== New technologies ==
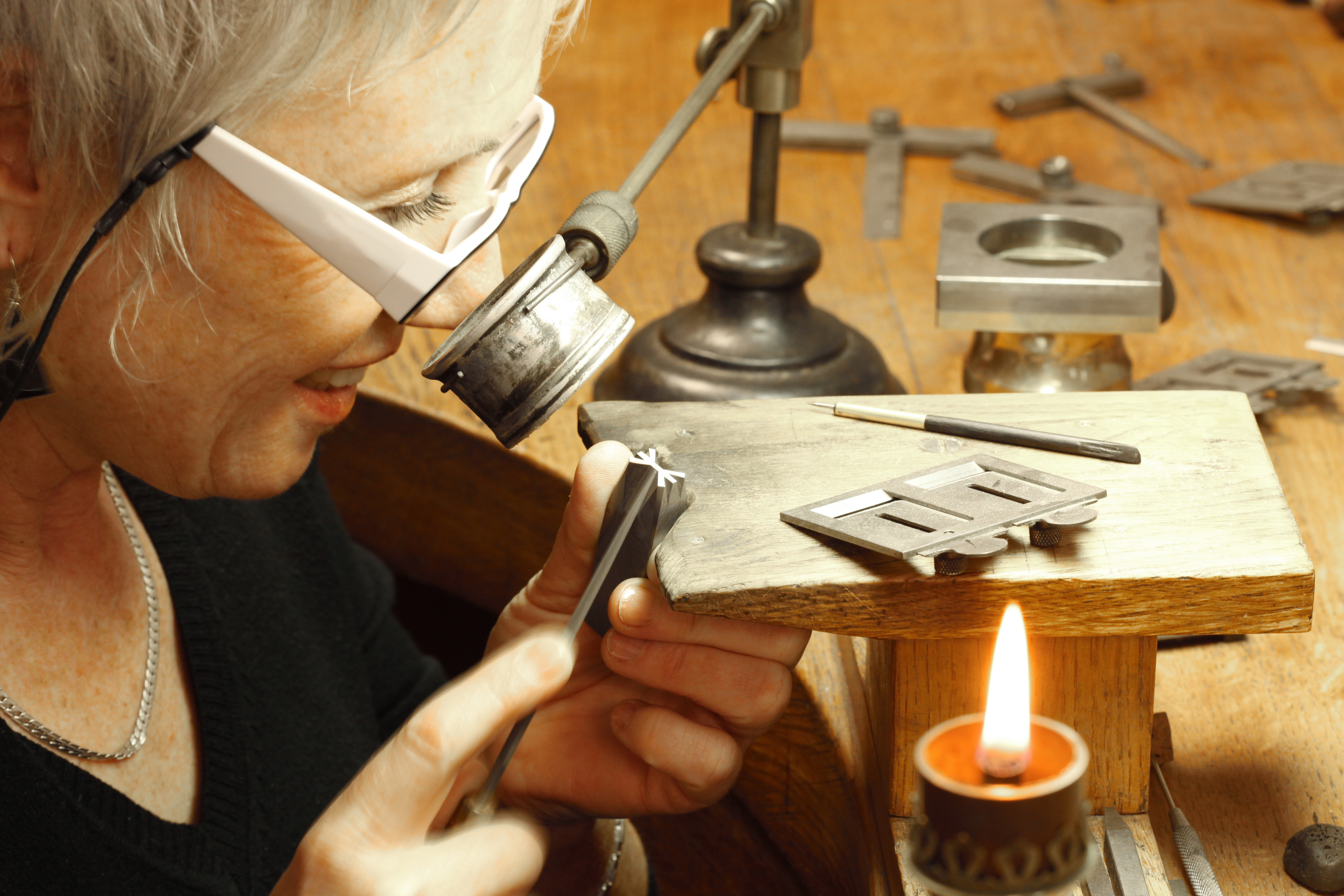
A demonstration by punchcutter Nelly Gable. The candle is to transfer soot onto the punch to make a smoke proof, a check of the punch's current impression on paper.

New technologies displaced manual punchcutting from the mid-nineteenth century.

Electrotyping from the 1840s is a technology used to form matrices of copper by electrodeposition around engravings of a letterform. This letterform could be in any metal, so engraving increasingly began to be done by cutting a letterform in soft typemetal. (Note: Various names were used for the 'punch' in soft metal carved for an electrotype. "Pattern letter" and "patrix" are common terms. Electrotyping was also used less honourably for piracy of pre-existing types.) This allowed an explosion in variety of typefaces, especially display typefaces that did not need to be cast so often and for which only a few matrices were needed, and allowed the regeneration (or, often, piracy) of types for which no punches or matrices were available. (Note: A slight problem with electrotyping of type is that the new form is slightly smaller than the original - according to Justin Howes, the calculation of the Stephenson Blake type foundry was that the shrinkage was small but could accumulate if a letterform was repeatedly regenerated. Stephenson Blake's solution was to squash type slightly in a press or file it down to broaden it before putting it into the electrotype bath.)

Pantograph engraving is a technology where a cutting machine is controlled by hand movements and allows type to be cut from large working drawings. It was initially introduced to printing to cut wood type used for posters and headlines. In the 1880s, the typefounder Linn Boyd Benton adapted the technology to cutting very small matrices and steel punches. This gave very precise results and transferred the place of individual creativity completely away from the engraving stage towards a drawing office.

Some punchcutters did continue to hold prestige for their artisanal work into the early or mid-twentieth century. These included Edward Prince, who cut many types for Arts and Crafts movement fine printers, Charles Malin in Paris, Otto Erler in Leipzig and P. H. Rädisch at Joh. Enschedé in Haarlem, who cut the types of Jan van Krimpen. Type designer Matthew Carter, who learned punchcutting from Rädisch while at an internship at Enschedé, has added commentary to a silent film of Rädisch at work in the 1950s.

The French Imprimerie Nationale was one of the few institutions to continue employing punchcutters into the twenty-first century, to demonstrate the historic technique and to fill out the character set of historic typefaces. Contemporary punchcutter Nelly Gable of the Imprimerie Nationale is one of the few female practitioners of the art.

== See also ==
- Amoretti Brothers
- Bradford Industrial Museum
- Commemorative coin
- Letterpress printing
