= Engineering (magazine) =

Engineering:
- Editor: Steve Welch
- Frequency: Monthly (previously weekly)
- Publisher: Media Culture PLC
- Founded: 1865
- Country: United Kingdom
- Language: English
- Website: www.engineeringmagazine.co.uk
- ISSN: 0013-7782

Engineering is a monthly British magazine founded in 1865. It was initially published by the Office for Publication and Advertisements and reported on developments and news in many disciplines of engineering in Britain and abroad. It is now produced and published by Media Culture PLC and has the strapline "for innovators in technology, manufacturing and management".

== History ==
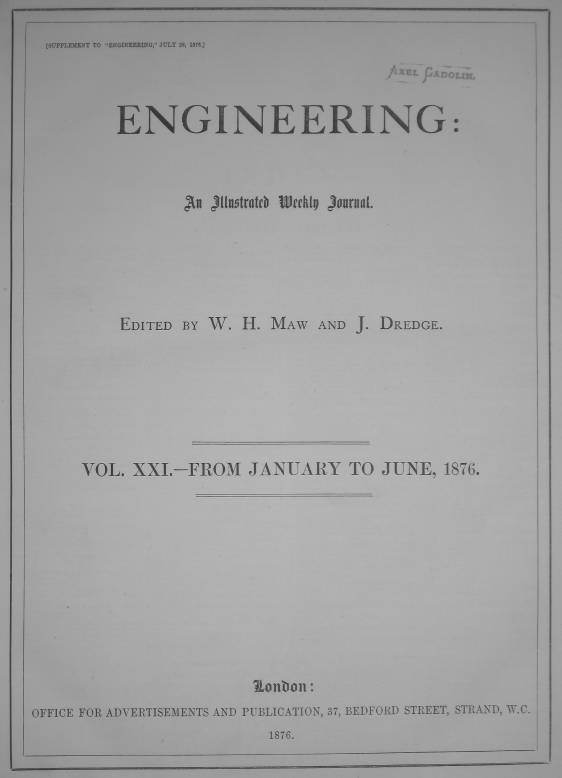
Title page, 1876

Engineering magazine was first published in 1866 by the American engineer and locomotive designer Zerah Colburn in London as a weekly rival to The Engineer, which Colburn had edited previously. It had the subtitle "an illustrated weekly journal".

Colburn had used funds provided by Henry Bessemer, the English engineer and inventor known chiefly in connection with the Bessemer process for the manufacture of steel. Engineering was an instant success and soon overtook The Engineer as Colburn's writing style and wide engineering knowledge gave readers the information they needed.

Engineering was initially published as an illustrated weekly magazine, edited by Zerah Colburn, with volumes published twice yearly in January and July. Volume 1 was issued 1866.

It was at one time published by the Design Council, later by Gifford Welch, and is now published by Media Culture PLC of Warwick.
