= John Radcliffe (St Albans MP) =

British Politician

John Radcliffe (1738–1783) was a British politician who sat in the House of Commons from 1768 to 1783.

== Biography ==
The Radcliffes were an old gentry family who were seated at Hitchin Priory the sixteenth century. Radcliffe inherited Hitchin Priory from his Uncle Arthur Radcliffe in 1769. He rebuilt the house in 1770-71 of plastered brick, standing about the four sides of a courtyard, which represents the old, small, cloister garth. Radcliffe was the third son of John Radcliffe, a merchant trading with Turkey and his wife Anne Alcock, daughter of Lawrence Alcock of Trotton Place, Sussex. He was educated at Eton College from 1754 to 1755. He married Lady Frances Howard, daughter of Henry Howard, 4th Earl of Carlisle on 14 April 1768. When they became engaged, George Selwyn wrote about Radcliffe to Lord Carlisle on 12 January 1768 “He is very well spoke of, et le nom est assez beau”. Carlisle wrote to Selwyn, from Rome on 18 June 1768 “Everybody gives Mr. R. such a good character.”

== Political ==
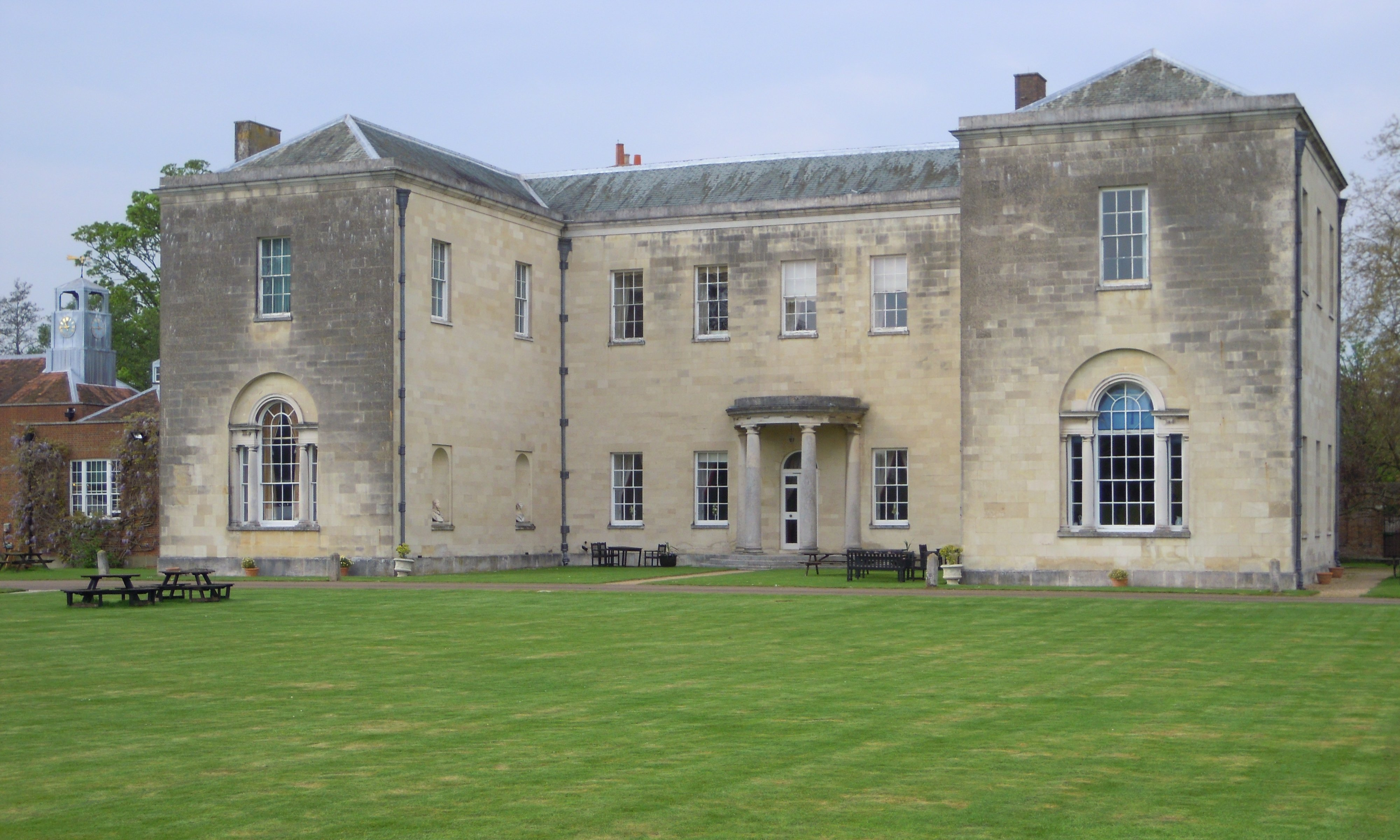
Hitchin Priory

Radcliffe was put forward at the 1768 general election for St Albans by Lord Grimston who on 21 September 1767 asked the Duke of Newcastle to give “an intimation ... to Mr. West in favour of Mr. Radcliffe my candidate”. Lord Spencer considered running two candidates for the borough but in the event Radcliffe was returned as Member of Parliament unopposed. His elections in 1774 and 1780 were also uncontested. During his first 11 years his attendance was irregular and before 8 March 1779 his name appeared in only eight out of 18 division lists.. However his name appears in 12 out of 13 division lists during the period which led to the fall of Lord North's Administration on 15 March 1782. All known votes by Radcliffe were given on the Opposition side but no speech by him is reported

== Legacy ==
Radcliffe died on 21 December 1783, aged 45 without issue. Hitchin Priory passed to his sister Penelope who had married Sir Charles Farnaby, 3rd Baronet on 12 August 1762. Farnaby adopted the name Radcliffe.

Parliament of Great Britain
Preceded by James West; Viscount Nuneham	Member of Parliament for St Albans; 1768–1783; With: (Sir) Richard Sutton 1768-1780; William Charles Sloper 1780-1783	Succeeded by William Charles Sloper; The Viscount Grimston
