= William Tulloch Jeans =

British parliamentary journalist and author (1848–1907)

- Born: 1848
- Died: 1907 (aged 58–59)
- Occupations: Parliamentary journalist, author
- Known for: Parliamentary journalism
- Children: James Jeans

William Tulloch Jeans (1848–1907) was a British parliamentary journalist and author. He served as parliamentary correspondent for The Globe and wrote several works on science, engineering and industrial history, including The Lives of Electricians (1887) and Creators of the Age of Steel (1884).

== Career ==
Jeans was parliamentary correspondent for The Globe, and was widely known for and consulted on his knowledge of parliamentary principle.

In their 1887 review of the first volume of The Lives of Electricians, The Spectator commented that, "Jeans has treated a subject always interesting in a pleasing and graceful way".

== Personal life ==
His wife came from Stockport. They lived in Brighton, then Tulse Hill and Clapham Park in London.

He was the father of Sir James Jeans OM FRS (1877–1946), physicist, astronomer and mathematician.

== Selected publications ==
- Creators of the Age of Steel (1884)
- The Lives of Electricians (1887, Whittaker & Co)
