= Hitchin Priory =

Carmelite friary founded in 1317, in Hertfordshire, England

Coordinates: 51.9451°N 0.2791°W

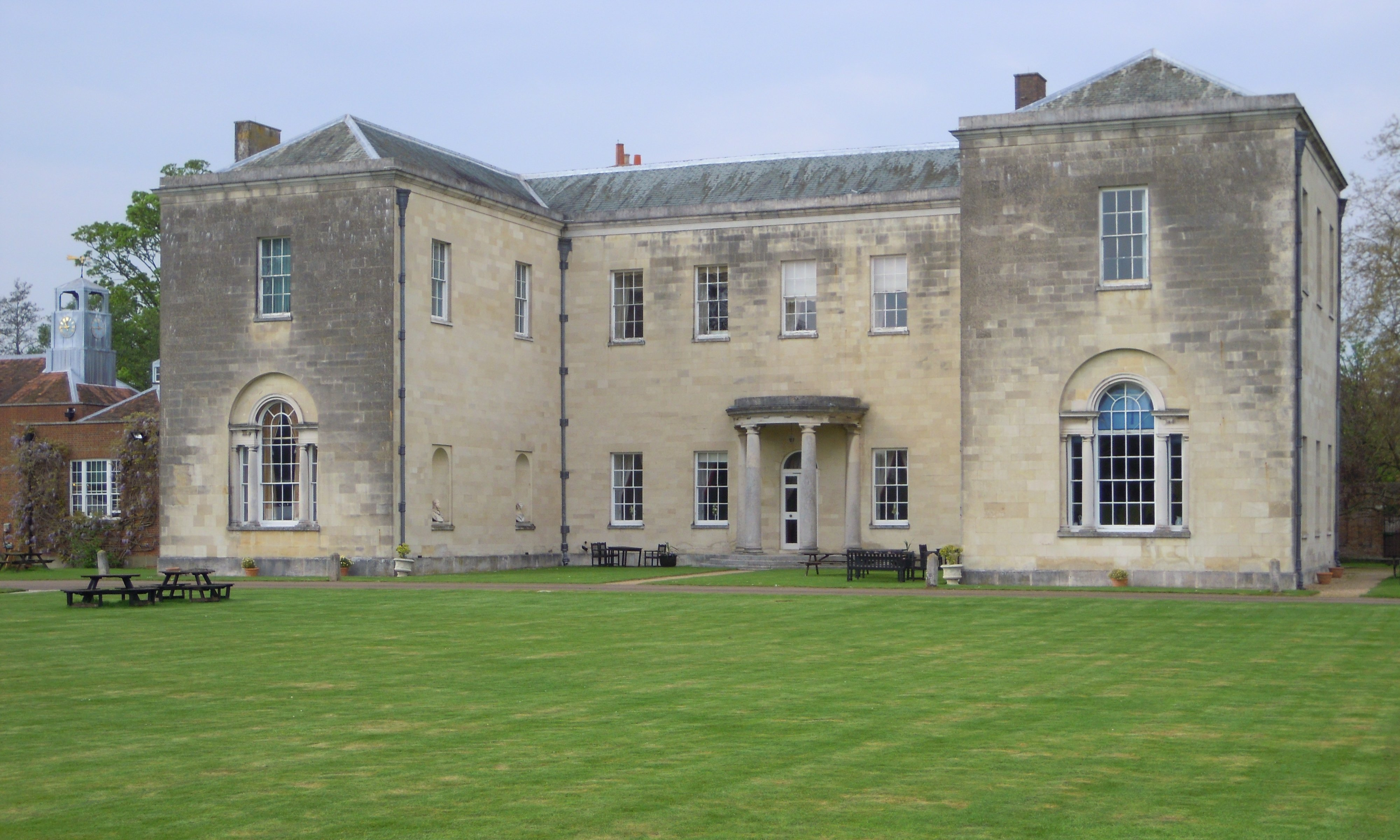
Hitchin Priory in 2014

Hitchin Priory in Hitchin in Hertfordshire is today a hotel built in about 1700 on the site of a Carmelite friary founded in 1317, which was closed in the Dissolution of the Monasteries during the reign of Henry VIII. Parts of the original priory are incorporated in the existing building, which has been a Grade I listed building on the Register of Historic England since 1951.

== History ==
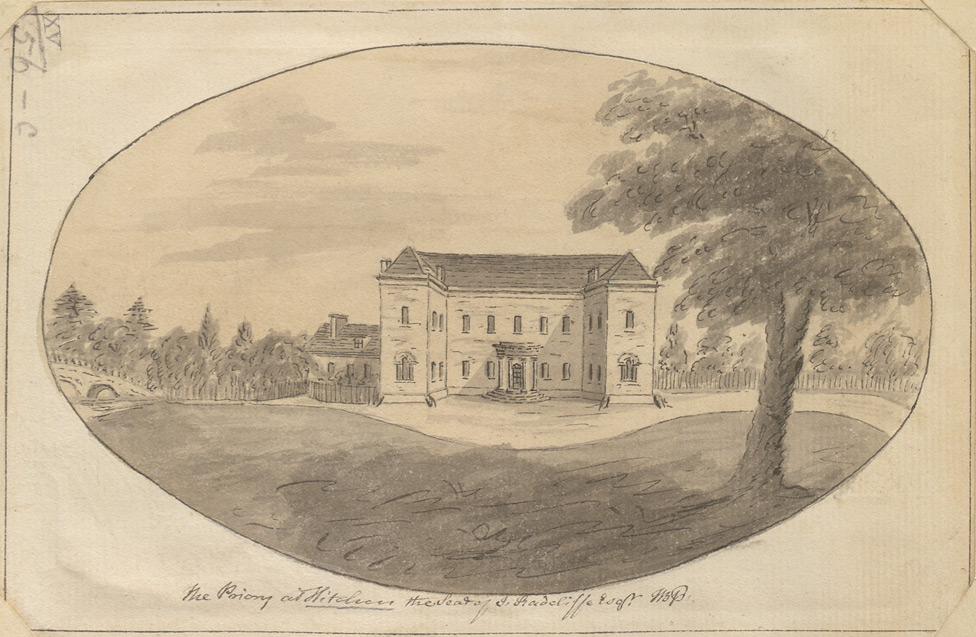
View of Hitchin Priory in 1795

In 1317 Edward II granted to the Carmelite Friars a messuage in the parish of Hitchin where they could build a church and house for their habitation. Other messuages and lands were given to them by John de Cobham. The Carmelites built a small convent there which was dedicated to the Blessed Virgin Mary. In September 1530 Henry VIII gave the friars at Hitchin a gift of 40 shillings. In May 1534 the Prior John Butler took the Oath of Supremacy and on 17 October 1538 he and four friars surrendered to Sir William Coffyn and Henry Crowche, the King’s Commissioners. The monks remained until the dissolution of their house in 1539. Thomas Parrys, acting as bailiff for the Crown, sold the plate and ornaments while the bells, lead, glass, tile and stone were stripped and the steeple knocked down – the desecrated site becoming a quarry for the local townspeople. In 1546 a survey was made of the priory and its whole estate. At that time the buildings of the priory consisted of a mansion house with a frater (refectory) and dorter (dormitory) over the cloister, a church, the 'old hall,' the Prior's lodging, and two little chambers for the brothers in addition to a kitchen, barn and other premises. There were also other tenements belonging to it in Bridge Street and Bull Street in Hitchin, which were leased out with the convent garden. With the exception of the mansion house, which had been kept in a good state of repair following the Dissolution, the remaining buildings were in a poor condition: 'all the buildings were sore decayed and very ruinous both in timber and tile for lack of reparations' with the former priory gardens 'like yards or waste places of ground'. The priory church was similarly in a poor state 'with the steeple broken down and decayed by the weather and all the lead, freestone, glass and bells gone.'

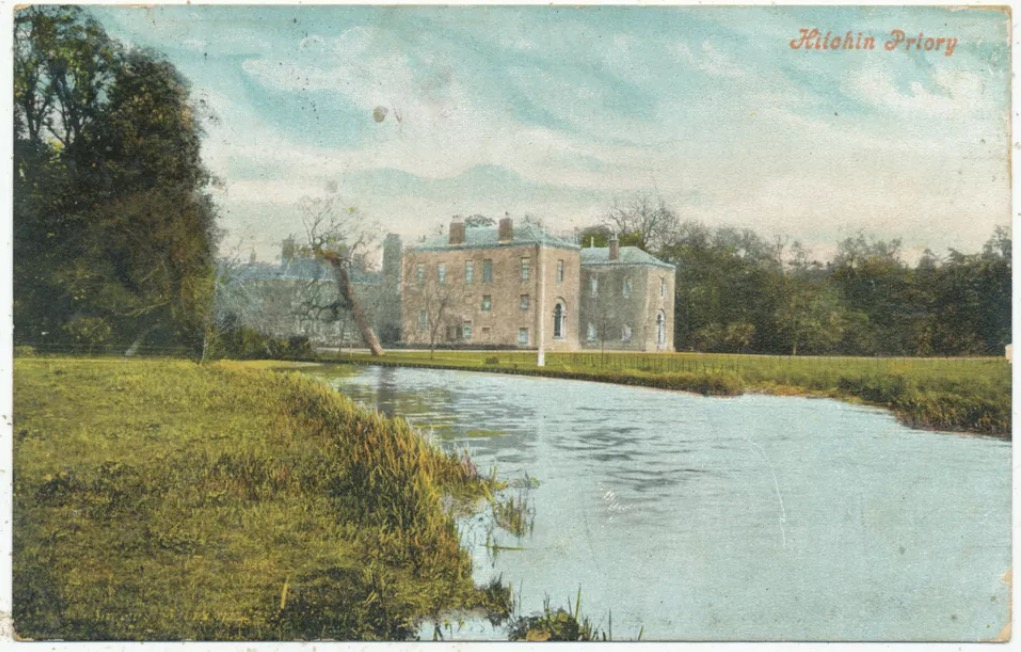
Hitchin Priory in a 1907 postcard

The 1546 survey of Hitchin Priory was made before the estate was sold that year for £1,541 to two property speculators, Sir Edward Watson of Northampton and Henry Herdson, a London skinner; also in 1546 they purchased Shrewsbury Abbey. From Watson and Herdson Hitchin Priory subsequently passed to Edward Pulter, who in turn sold it in 1553 to Ralph Radcliffe (died 1559). He on his death bequeathed his estates to his oldest son, also named Ralph. Over the next three centuries the Priory passed to various members of the Radcliffe family until it came into the possession of Hubert Delmé-Radcliffe, J.P., on whose death in 1878 it passed to his brother Francis Augustus Delmé-Radcliffe. The various branches of the Delmé-Radcliffe Family owned Hitchin Priory from 1553 to 1964.

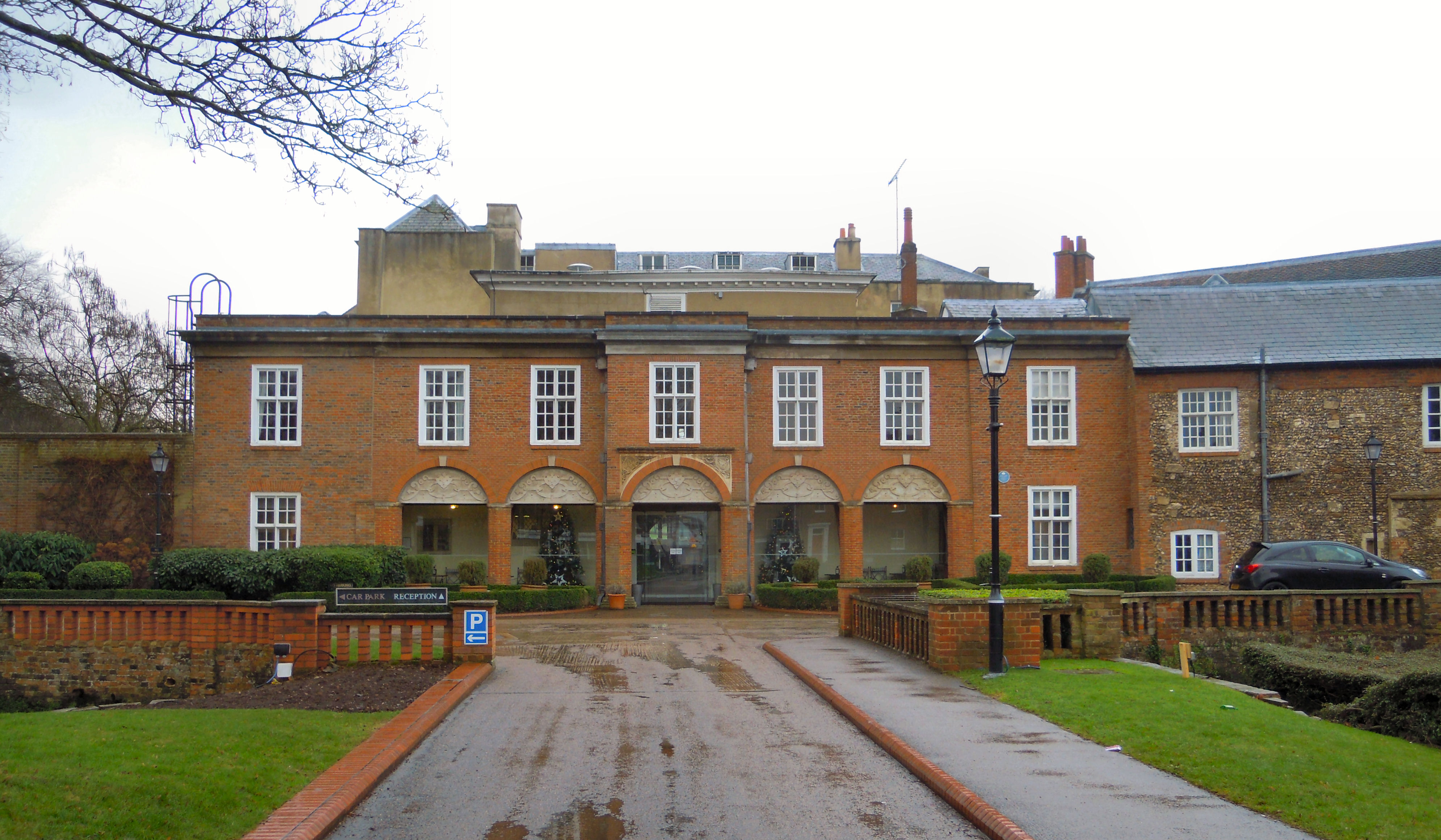
Front entrance to Hitchin Priory in 2016

Hitchin Priory as it now stands incorporates a small part of the original priory of the Carmelites. This original structure would appear to have been constructed of flint rubble and clunch with the now lost priory church located to the south. However, nothing earlier than the 15th century is visible and these ancient remains are located in sections of the north, or frater, range of the west range. The present structure was almost entirely built in 1770–1 by the politician and MP John Radcliffe who inherited Hitchin Priory from his uncle Arthur Radcliffe in 1769. He rebuilt the house in 1770-71 of plastered brick, standing about the four sides of a courtyard, which represents the old, small, cloister garth. The walls of the courtyard have been considerably renewed over the years but in the north and west wings are many blocked arches of the original cloister arcade. The ground storey displays a shield of the Radcliffe arms is together with the initials R R S and the date 1679. This has an arcade of five semicircular arches with the one remaining open arch being the main entrance to the building. The north elevation is of the late 18th century and is in an elaborate Palladian design; the south wing was completely rebuilt at around this time and contains the main rooms. The east wing has some early 17th-century panelling while in a small north room is a plaster ceiling dating to the same period with cable and foliate decoration.

Since 1951 the complex of buildings including Hitchin Priory, the Garden Bridge, Coach House and stables have formed part of the Grade I listing on the Register of Historic England.

== Modern times ==
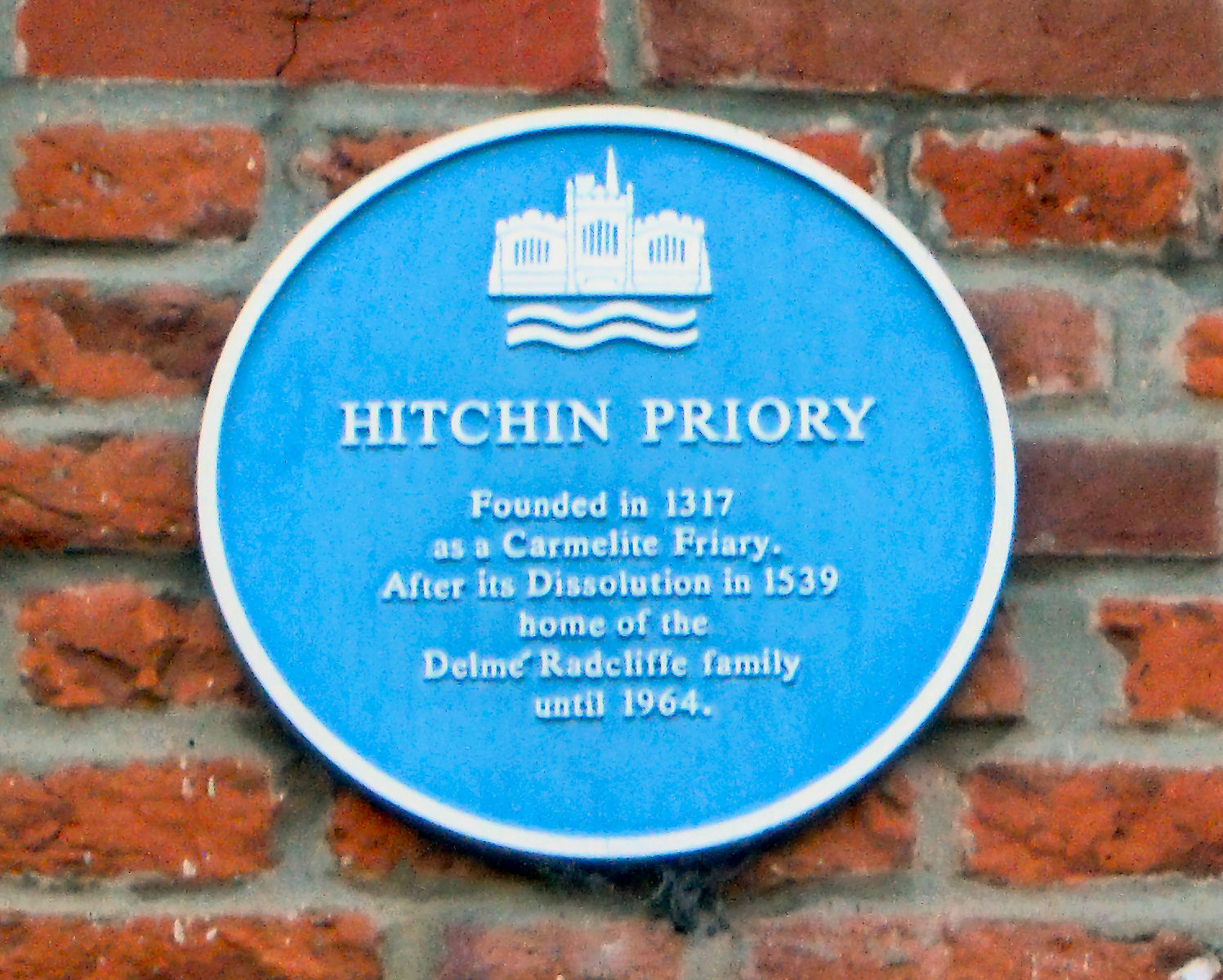
Blue plaque on the frontage of Hitchin Priory

Today Hitchin Priory is a 52 bedroom hotel sitting in 19 acres of parkland making it a popular venue for weddings, conferences, etc. The hotel underwent a programme of complete refurbishment in 2009. In 2013 Hitchin Priory was offered for sale at £3 million.
