= Cité fleurie =

Cité Fleurie
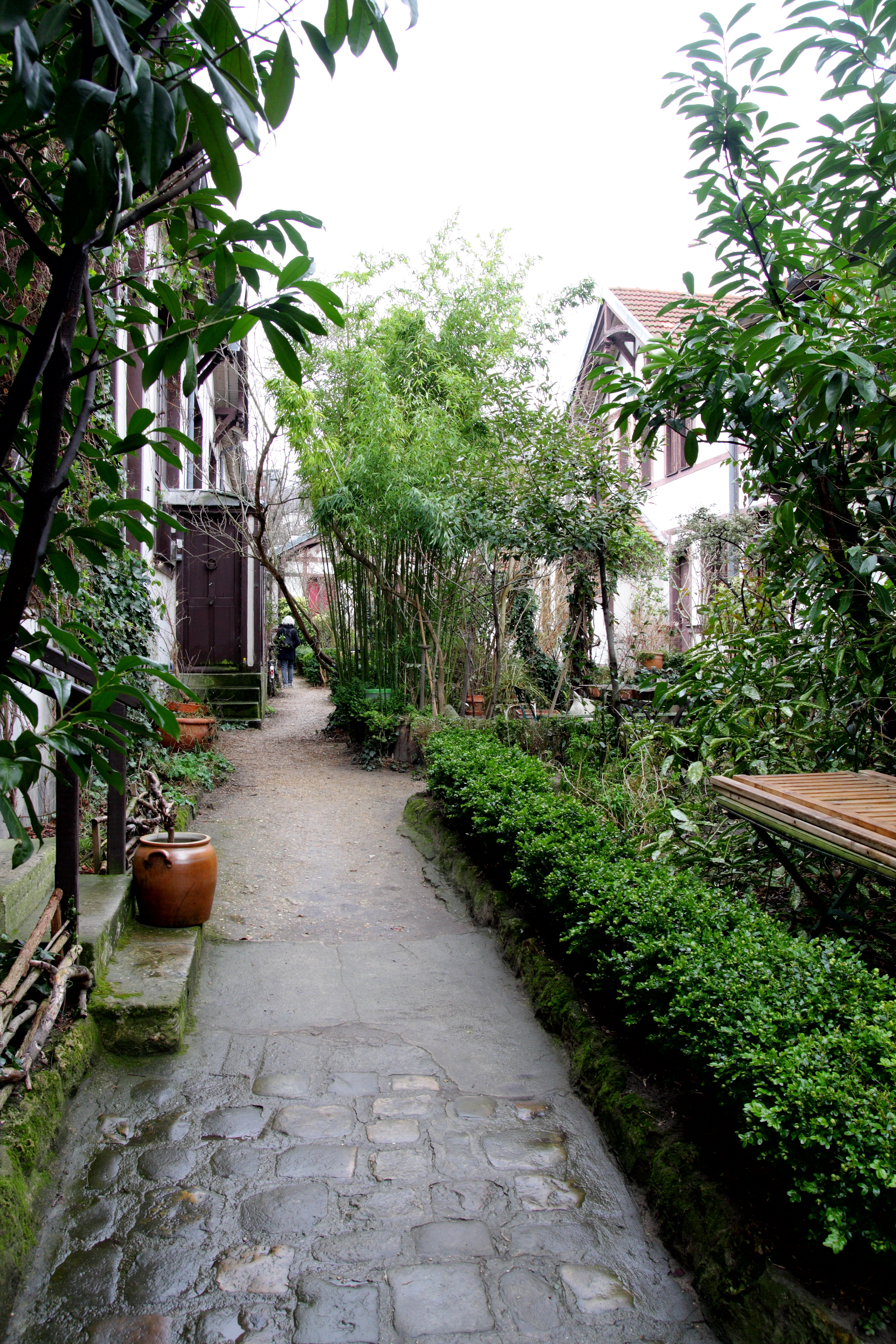
- The Cité Fleurie
- Interactive map of the Cité Fleurie area

General information
- Type: Artists' studio complex
- Location: 61-67 Boulevard Arago, Paris, France

Design and construction
- Known for: Artists’ studios; residents including César Domela, Amedeo Modigliani, Mela Muter, Paul Gauguin and Edvard Munch.

The Cité fleurie is a historic artists’ studio complex in the 13th arrondissement of Paris. It comprises a group of 29 timber-framed artist workshops arranged around a shared garden courtyard and is located between 61 and 67 Boulevard Arago.

The studios, built in the Anglo-Norman style, retain their original use and are partially protected as a historical monument.

Notable past residents include Modigliani, Gauguin, Munch, Mount Rushmore sculptor Gutzon Borglum, the Polish painter Mela Muter, Ford Madox Ford, César Domela and Doctor Dolittle author Hugh Lofting.

== Context and construction history ==
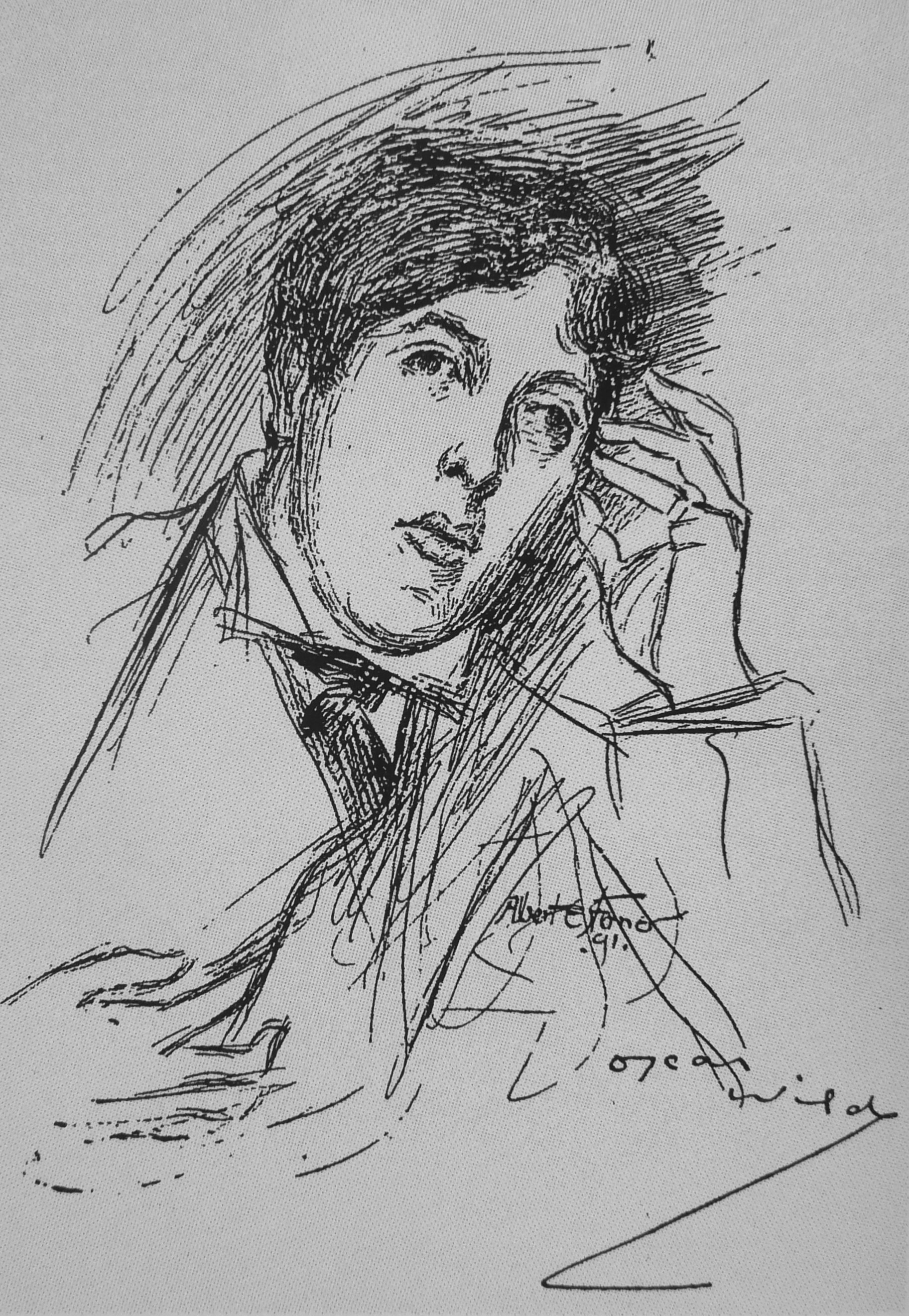
Albert Sterner's portrait of Oscar Wilde, executed in 1891 at the Cité Fleurie.

In the late 19th and early 20th centuries, Paris saw a proliferation of purpose-built artist studio constructed with inexpensive materials salvaged from the stands of the city’s recent World’s Fairs. Besides the Cité fleurie, notable examples include La Ruche studio complex, which incorporated ironwork from the 1900 Exposition’s Wine Pavilion, and the Cité des fusains in Montmartre.

The Cité fleurie was built in two stages on a 2,000m^{2} plot of wasteland owned by Jules Hunebelle, mayor of nearby Clamart. The project included input from architect Hilaire Renault and engineer M. Montmorin-Jentel and reused materials from the pavillon de l’Alimentation of the 1878 World's Fair.

The row of studios forming the initial part of the complex is situated at the back of the plot. According to construction permits preserved in the Paris archives, the second row of studios facing the new Boulevard Arago was added in 1888.

The structural design remained consistent between both phases: a masonry base with half‑timber upper parts, with each unit offering a tall studio space with large front and roof windows, and living quarters behind or above. According to secondary sources, the stonework used was salvaged from the recently destroyed Palais des Tuileries, while the low height of the buildings was dictated by the presence of catacombs beneath.

The studios, relatively comfortable and spacious by Parisian standards, attracted many who chose to settle for decades at a time. Sculptors in particular favoured the high-ceilinged ground-floor spaces.

== Name ==
For most of its history, the site had no formal name. It the late 19th century, due to resident artists' unusual behaviour and attire, it was nicknamed "la petite Sainte Anne" (little Saint Anne) after the nearby asylum. In the early 1970s, during efforts to protect the complex from demolition, French painter Henri Cadiou popularised the name the Cité fleurie (“Flowered Hamlet” or “Flowery Studio Complex”). Cadiou argued that providing a name would help preserve the site as, “un endroit qui n’a pas de nom n’existe pas” (“a place with no name does not exist”).

Cadiou’s naming of the Cité fleurie and the nearby Cité verte drew attention to the two artist residences' verdant, bucolic character, highlighting campaigners’ calls for the preservation of urban green spaces.

== Early years of the Cité fleurie (1878-1899) ==
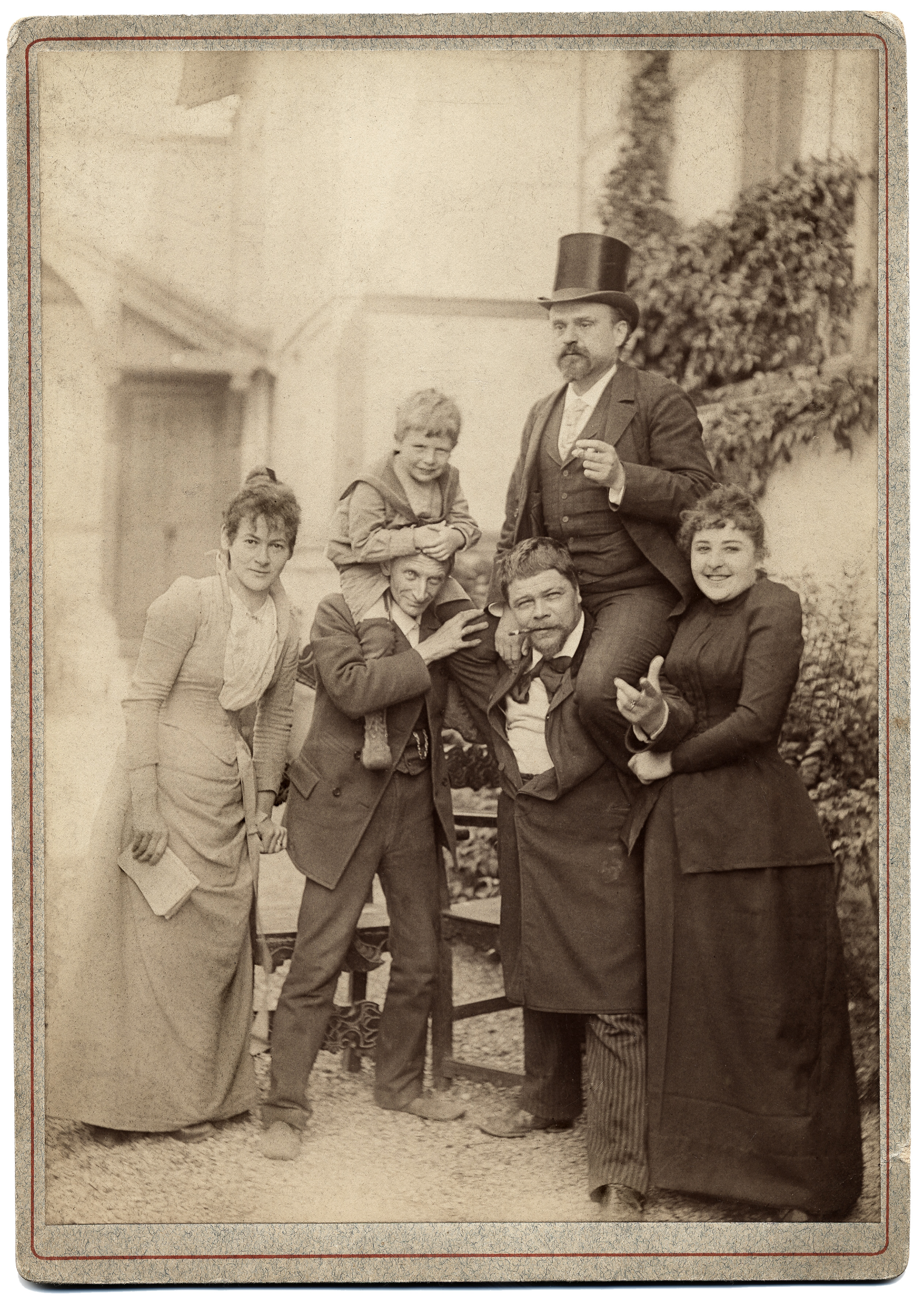
Sculptor Robert Stigell (pictured third from the left) at the Cité fleurie. He arrived in May 1886 and lived in the studio next to the concierge.

From its inception, the Cité Fleurie served as both a residence and workspace for artists. Quickly the address developed into a community of international residents prominent in both art and politics. Members of the early colony include the Viennese orientalist painters Charles Wilda and Ludwig Deutsch, sculptor Arthur Strasser, and the Colombian painter Wenceslao de la Guardia.

In 1888, the Canadian artists George Agnew Reid and Mary Hiester Reid arrived at Boulevard Arago at the invitation of their friend Paul Peel, who had already established a studio there. The Reids’ workshop was adjacent to that of Eugène Grasset, a leading figure in the emerging Art Nouveau movement, who helped them settle in. Other residents and studio neighbours who associated with the Canadian group of this time include the celebrated Filipino artists Félix Resurrección Hidalgo and Juan Luna.

Luna’s large studio at the Cité fleurie was a gathering place for Filipino students, artists, and reformist intellectuals, brought together by the writer José Rizal, who also lodged there for a time. This informal grouping became known as Los Indios Bravos (The Brave Indians), a colonial slur which Rizal reappropriated as a marker of collective identity and pride. (Note: The name was inspired by a visit to the 1889 World's Fair, where Rizal witnessed a Wild West show featuring Native Americans hailed as "the Brave Indians.") A plaque outside the Cité fleurie commemorates the site's significance in the Filipino anti-colonial movement.

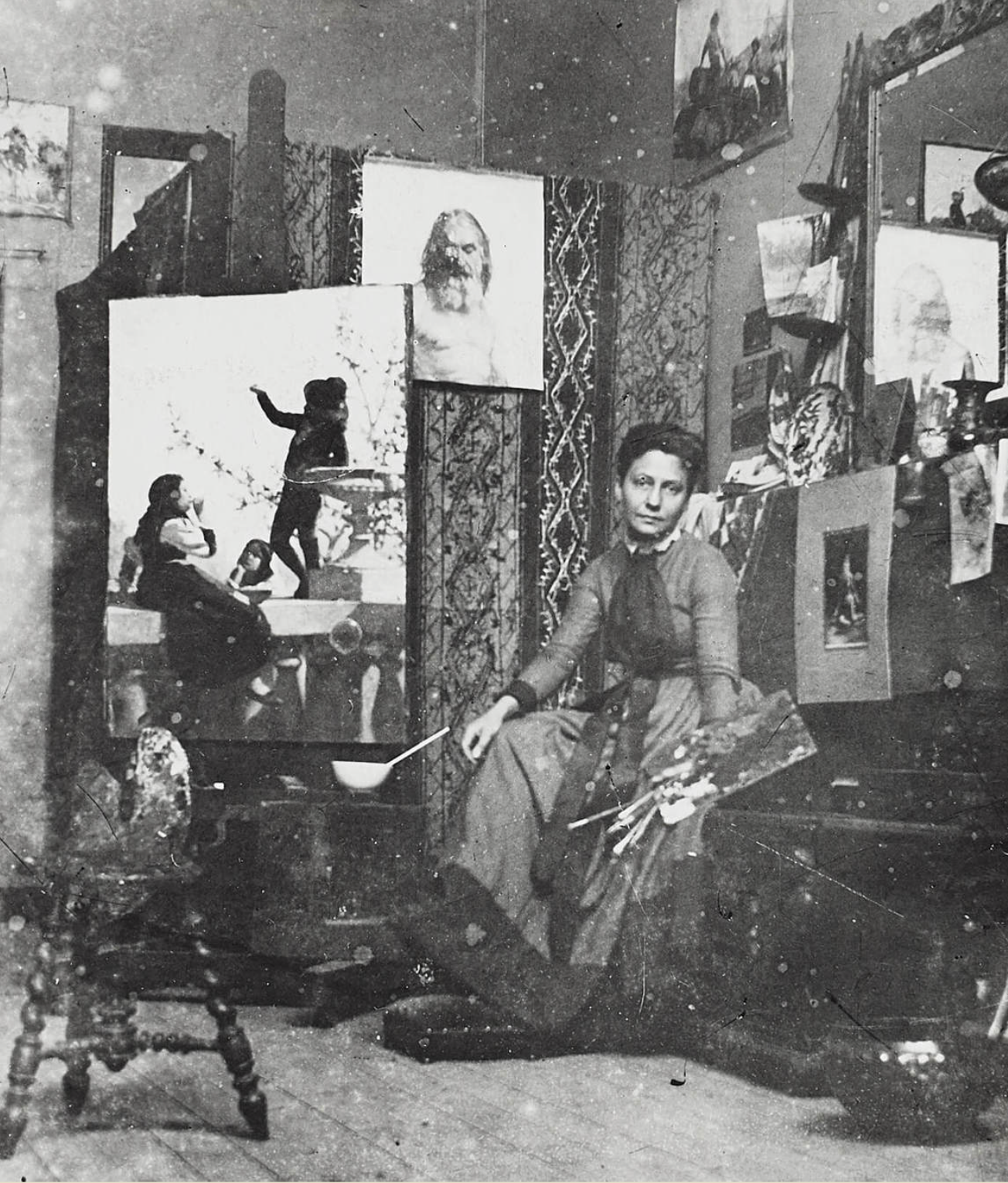
Mary Hiester Reid in her studio at la Cité Fleurie by George Agnew Reid

In the 1890s, the complex also became home to an important circle of Danish and other Northern European Symbolist artists centred around the sculptor Niels Hansen Jacobsen. Among the first to arrive was the Swede Per Hasselberg, followed by the Dane Anders Bundgaard, who found the address at the request of his teacher Stephan Sinding. Sinding occupied one studio, while a neighbouring workshop was used by his students, among whom were Menga Schjelderup, Thomas Bærentzen, and Axel Ebbe. (Note: Besides Bundgaard, Schjelderup, Bærentzen, and Ebbe, Sinding's students at Boulevard Arago included Rasmus Harboe, Johanne Pedersen-Dan, and a Ms. Heiberg. See: "Fransk Art Nouveau-keramik i Danmark" (PDF). Vejen Kunstmuseum (in Danish).) The Nordic colony of the 1890s expanded to include artists such as Swedish sculptor Agnes de Frumerie, Danes Axel Hou and Carl Johan Bonnesen, and the Finn Emil Wikström. The Danish-American sculptor Gutzon Borglum, later renowned for creating Mount Rushmore, also worked at the Cité fleurie at this time at studio 26.

During the same period, a number of figures associated with the decorative arts were also resident. Eugène Grasset, a leading figure in the development of the 1900 style, and decorative ceramicist Alexandre Bigot both maintained workshops at Boulevard Arago. (Note: Grasset had a studio at the Cité Fleurie from at least 1883, remaining there until his death in 1917.) Paul Jeanneney, an engineer with a substantial fortune, assembled an important collection of Japanese stoneware in his studio there. In 1888, this interest brought him into contact with ceramicist Jean Carriès who also occupied the Cité fleurie and was often visited by the designer Georges Hoentschel. These decorative artists interacted closely with the Nordic circle, and facilitated introductions in the French art world.

In its early years, the complex became home to a number of students of the history painter Jean-Paul Laurens, including Richard Hall, Burt Harwood, and William Blair Bruce. Laurens himself was closely associated with the site, maintaining a studio at number 22 for many years.

One of the most well-known figures associated with the Cité fleurie in the late 19th century is Paul Gauguin. Returning to Paris from Tahiti in 1893, Gauguin stayed at the complex in the studio of his friend Daniel de Monfreid. After his later return to Tahiti, Gauguin continued to use the Boulevard Arago to forward his paintings.

== Early twentieth century (1900-1917) ==
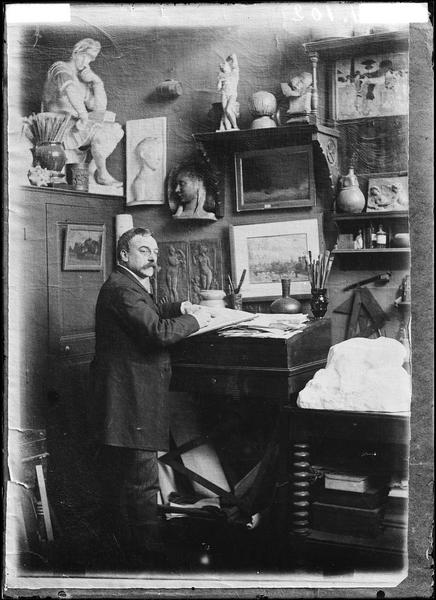
Eugène Grasset in his studio at the Cité Fleurie.

In the early 20th century, the Cité fleurie continued to attract artists from diverse nationalities and to nurture creative collaboration. Residents sometimes worked together in a common studio on the grounds, sharing the cost of models and assisting one another in their work.

Beginning in 1900, Rodin was a regular visitor, at times calling on father and son patination specialists Jean François Germain Limet and Jean Élie Auguste Limet almost daily. The Limets' studio at the Cité fleurie was a regular meeting place for sculptors and was also frequented by Bourdelle, Maillol, and Despiau.

At this time, Boulevard Arago also became home to a small but notable community of Polish artists. Among them were the painter Mela Muter, later one of the most prominent female artists of the 20th century, and her close friend Leopold Gottlieb. Others include the painter and critic Czesław Zawadziński, who lived for many years at studio 12.

In the spring of 1903, Edvard Munch set up his studio at Boulevard Arago during a brief visit to Paris. Munch's cousin Anna Elisabeth Munch had been a member of the Northern European colony who frequented Niels Hansen Jacobsen's studio in the 1890s.

The Breton sculptor Jean Boucher also maintained a studio at the Cité fleurie, where he created the models for his celebrated monumental works. In a feature published in Gil Blas on 18th June 1904, art critic Louis Vauxcelles described Boucher's workshop:

"On the walls, coated in lime plaster, a few photographs of masterpieces: a Madonna by Da Vinci, the Colleone, Ligier Richier, Rodin. Shelves piled with books, many books. On the floor, between a bucket of water and a tub of clay, a long-haired barbet stretched out and slept. On the sofa, a friend read aloud [...]. The model, a young painter, son of a famous philologist, posed with one foot on the pedestal…"

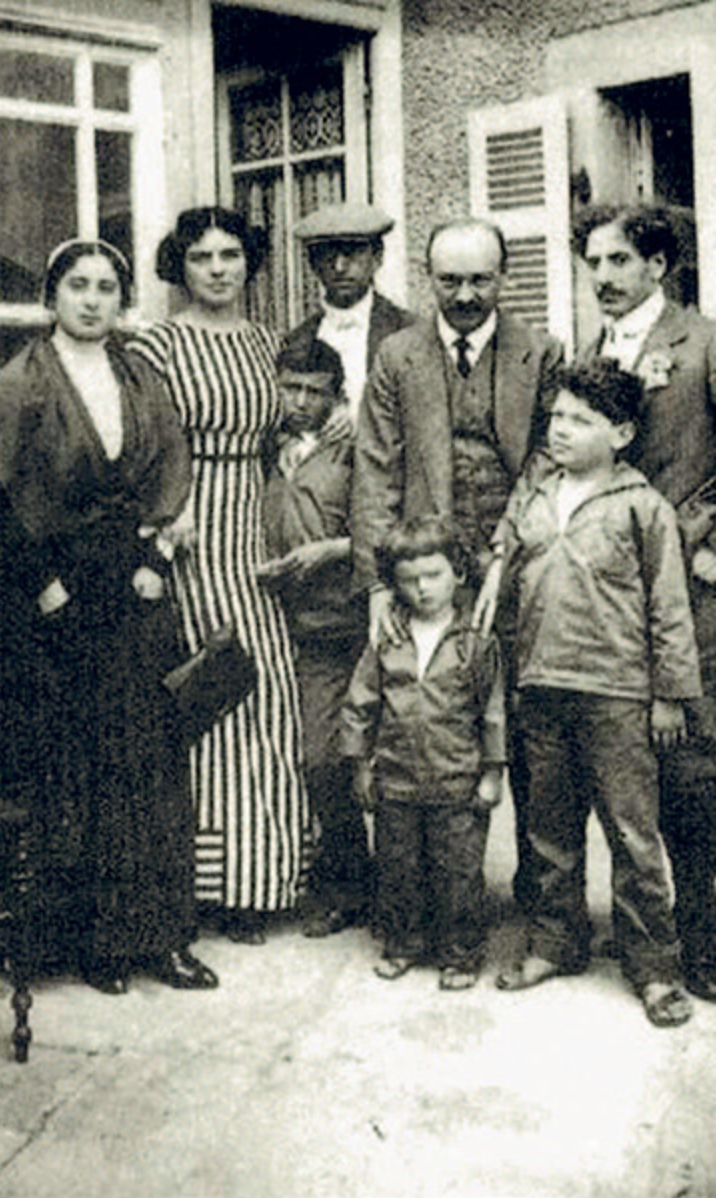
Mela Muter at the Cité fleurie in 1905.

Works created by Boucher at the Cité fleurie include his monument to Ernest Renan (1903), Victor Hugo in Guernsey (1908) and the War Memorial at the École des Beaux-Arts (1923).

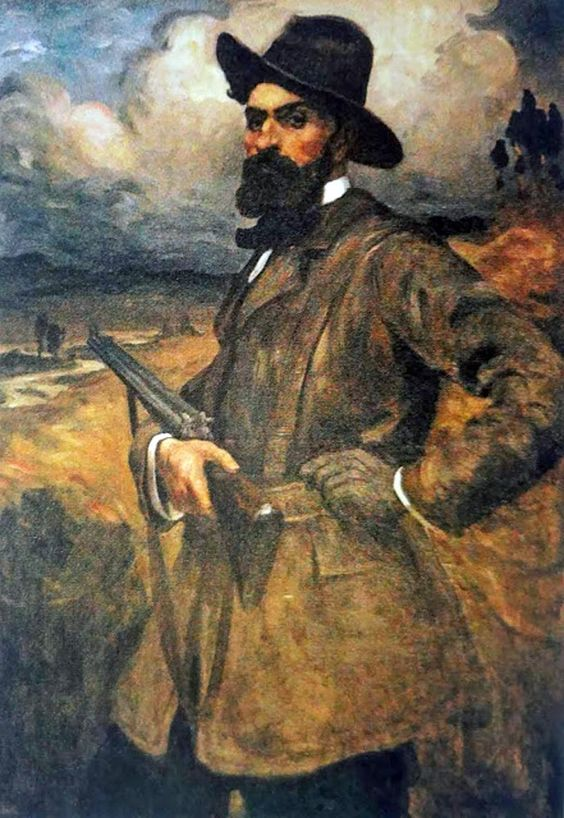
Gaston Balande self-portrait, 1913

English Impressionist Ethel Carrick and the Australian painter Emanuel Phillips Fox arrived shortly after their marriage in May 1905, becoming prominent figures in the expatriate community. When their friend Penleigh Boyd moved to Paris in spring 1912, he joined them at the Cité fleurie, where he met his future wife, Edith Gerard Anderson. After Fox's death in 1915, Carrick remained at Boulevard Arago for many years, giving lessons in her studio where Rupert Bunny, a frequent guest, also instructed students.

Hilda Rix, a visitor to Carrick and Fox's studio, describes "an archway off the wide Boulevard [Arago], and beyond it a surprise of quaint courtyards and creepers, twisting cobble paths, wicker gates, and the loveliest little gardens on to which open doors and windows of studios and flats."

The early twentieth century continued to see students of Laurens settling at the plot. These include proto-surrealist Pierre Roy, who arrived in November 1904, as well as his friend Charles Péquin. Roy also studied under neighbour Eugène Grasset. Other of Laurens' students include the Dutch painter Richard Reimans, whose studio at Boulevard Arago was preserved by his widow into the 1970s, and Gaston Balande, who established himself at the Cité fleurie in March 1910.

The year Balande arrived, Russian mosaicist Boris Anrep also settled at Boulevard Arago, opening his studio at number 6. Anrep was a well-loved member of the colony and hosted numerous other artists over the years including Natalia Goncharova and Mikhail Larionov. Henry Lamb was also a frequent guest at Anrep's studio, which the Russian artist kept until his death in 1969.

The German artist Max Bezner, who caused a scandal attempting to exhibit a bust of Kaiser Wilhelm at the Salon, moved from la Ruche to the Cité fleurie in 1910. Following the outbreak of the war, his studio on Boulevard Arago was sequestered, revealing 28 statuettes of Wilhelm II in marble, bronze, and plaster, along with numerous portraits of the Kaiser.

Several years before the First World War, Mexican painter Angel Zárraga was living at studio number 9 of the Cité fleurie with his mother and grandmother. According to secondary sources, Amedeo Modigliani sublet Zárraga's studio on a number of occasions.

== The Interwar period (1918-1939) ==
According to long-term resident Ethel Carrick, the Cité fleurie of the interwar period was a "cosmopolitan little colony of hard-working artists [...] thirty different nationalities being represented." At this time, many English-speaking artists settled there, as a weak franc made studios and living costs in Paris inexpensive. Among them were painter sisters from New York Matilda and Elizabeth McCord, whose studio became an artistic and social centre for many Americans, and dancer Florence Campbell, who taught the Charleston in her studio.

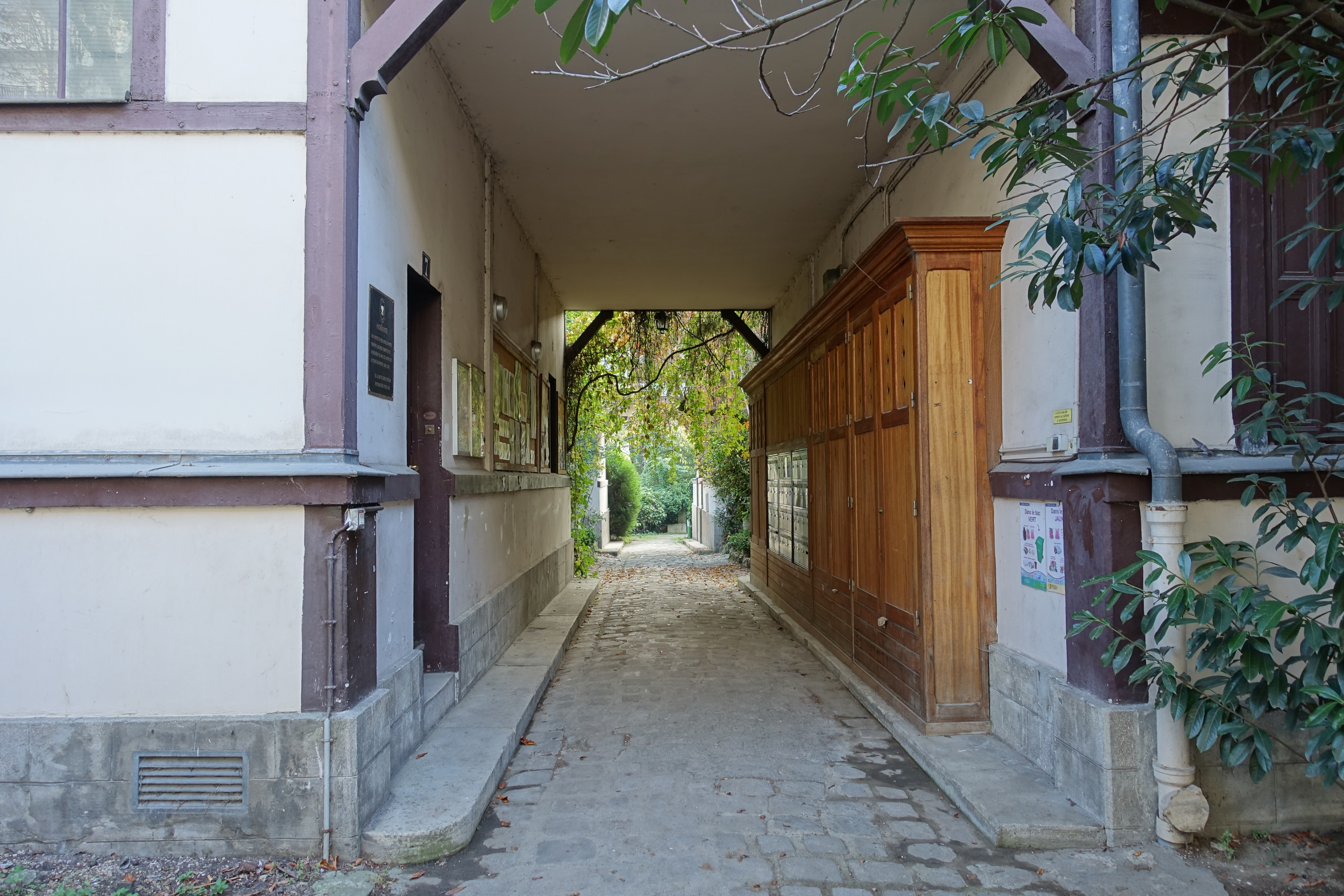
Internal passageway at the Cité fleurie.

In late 1923, Ford Madox Ford and Stella Bowen moved in "behind a group of shabby old studios" at the complex on Boulevard Arago. The space became both their home and Ford’s working base during a highly productive period in Paris, as well as the headquarters of the Transatlantic Review. Shortly after Ford and Bowen's arrival they were joined by the British novelist Jean Rhys.

Other Americans to settle at the Cité fleurie in the 1920s include Hugh Lofting, author of the Doctor Doolittle books.

The Anglophone artistic community also counted the Scottish painter Mary Stewart Gibson, who occupied studio number 19 for a number of years. In an article for The Bathgate Academy Chronicle, she describes the Cité fleurie as a "colony of bungalow studios" with "creeping vines, fruit trees and a profusion of greenery and flowers."

In the 1920s, the property was also home to the sculptor and designer Céline Lepage, who was active in the Art Deco movement and known for her work in ceramics, bronze, and decorative arts. A contemporary article referred to her studios at the Cité fleurie as "veritable museums of the beautiful handicrafts of Africa" which inspired her work.

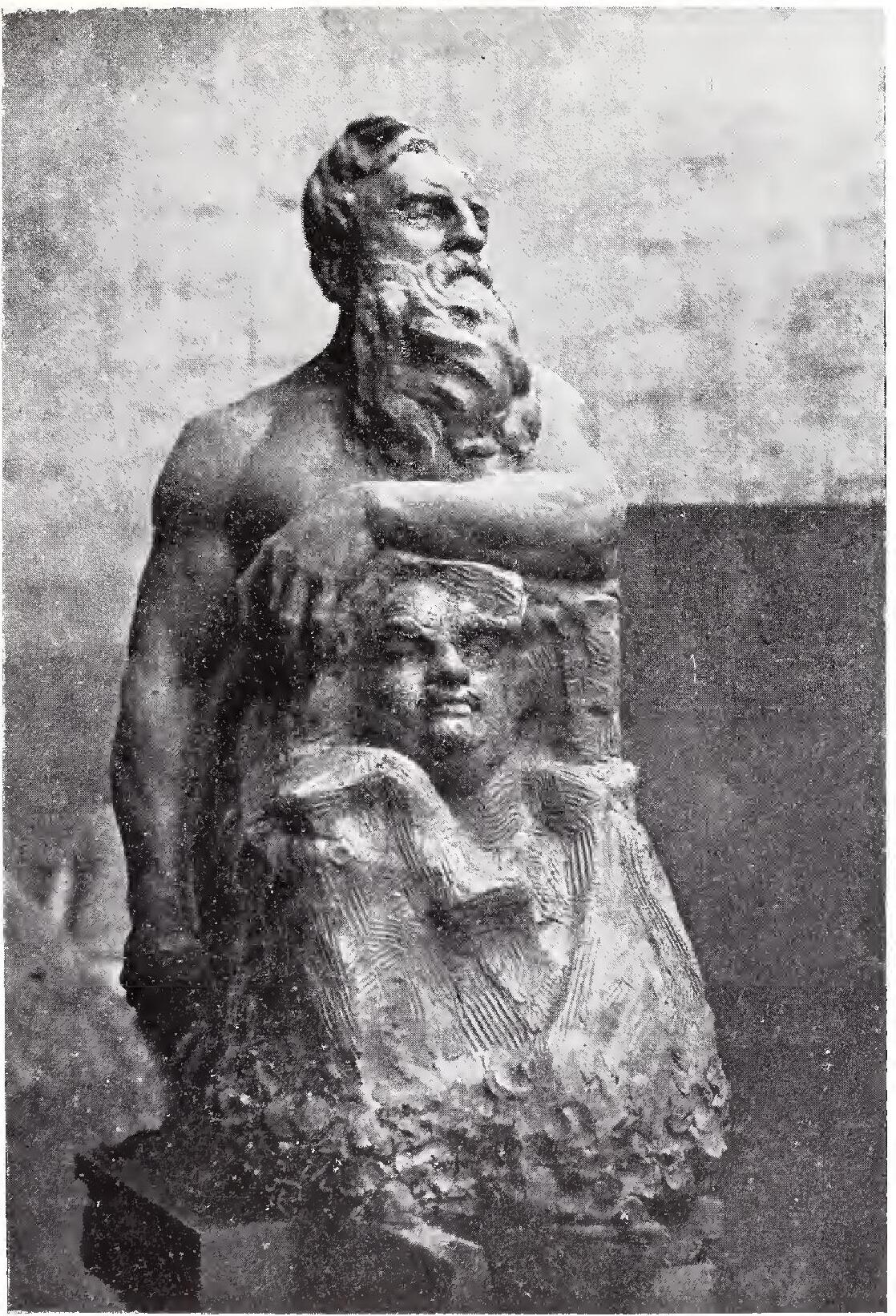
Sudbinin's 1911 statue of his teacher, Rodin, executed in his Boulevard Arago studio.

Sculptor Serafim Sudbinin, a former student of Rodin, had first arrived at Boulevard Arago around 1905 and was a prominent figure in the Russian community at the Cité fleurie during the 1920s and 1930s. His studio welcomed figures such as the singer Feodor Chaliapin as well as dancers Anna Pavlova and Tamara Karsavina. Other members of the Russian colony of this period include Boris Anrep, the sculptors Vera Papova and Viatcheslav Garine, and painters Georges Lapchine, Boris Sakharoff, and Nathalie Ericson.

César Domela, a prominent figure of the Dutch neo‑plasticist De Stijl movement took over Laurens' old studio at number 22 in 1933. His workshop became both a site of artistic creation and a centre of anti-fascist activity. Domela and his wife were involved with the Anti-fascist Archive at the Cité fleurie and attended all the meetings at the Library of Burned Books which was established in a studio there in 1934. Domela's studio at Boulevard Arago was later the site of a close friendship with Nicolas de Staël, who visited almost daily.

Other figures involved in the Ant-fascist struggle at the Cité fleurie were sculptor Octave Simon. Before the war, he created notable works, including a statue of the Renaissance scholar Guillaume Fichet. During the German occupation, Simon joined the Resistance, and his studio was raided, his works largely destroyed.

Activity at the studio complex was partially interrupted during the Occupation; however, a number of artists returned and continued working there for years following the Liberation, among them painters Louis Bouquet and Louis Latapie and sculptor Vera Papova.

== The German Freedom Library (1934-1939) ==
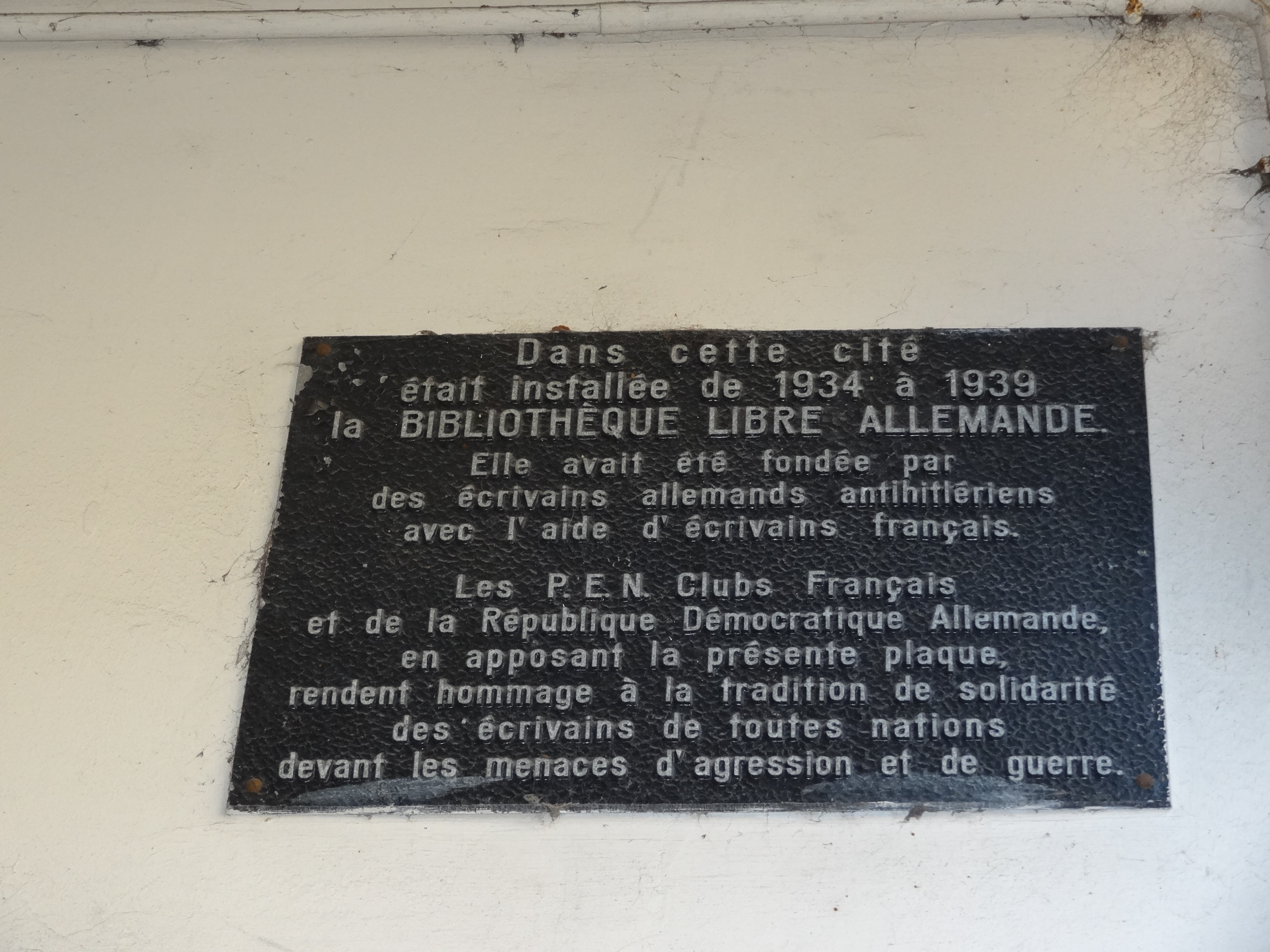
A plaque commemorating the German Freedom Library

An external plaque at the Cité fleurie commemorates a library for exiled German intellectuals that operated at studio 17 between 1934 and 1939.

Known as the Deutsche Freiheitsbibliothek (German Freedom Library) and sometimes referred to as the Library of Burned Books, it collected works banned by the Nazi regime and was directed by Max Schroeder, Lya Kralik and the author Heinrich Mann. Alfred Kantorowicz served as its general secretary.

The project grew out of the Anti-Fascist Archive assembled by German Communist Willi Münzenberg from newspaper clippings, documents and pamphlets.

The German Freedom Library was inaugurated on 10 May 1934, marking the anniversary of the Berlin book burnings. Notable members of its committee included H. G. Wells, Bertrand Russell, André Gide, and Lion Feuchtwanger. Studio 17 was also the headquarters of the illegal French branch of the International Workers Aid.

By the end of 1934, the library had grown into a substantial archive, preserving banned German books alongside materials documenting the Nazi regime’s cultural policies, its persecution of dissident writers, and works produced by exiled authors. By 1935, the collection exceeded 50,000 volumes. The archive was believed to have been seized by the Gestapo in 1940 and subsequently destroyed. However, this assumption was challenged in 1990 when a handwritten catalogue was discovered in the Bibliothèque nationale de France documenting approximately 1,400 works seized by the French police and deposited there in February 1940.

== Concièrge Berthe Laurain and Jewish artists during the Occupation (1940-1944) ==
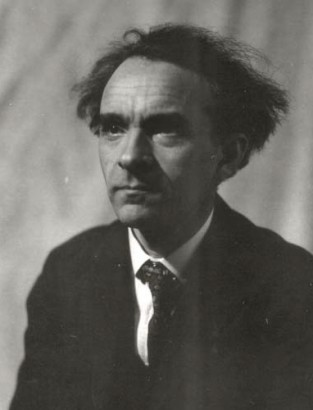
Bruno Beran

During the War, the concierge of the Cité Fleurie, Berthe Laurain, used her close connections with the police to warn Jewish residents of impending raids on the complex. A mother of five from Moselle, Laurain risked her own safety to save tenants from arrest and deportation. Among those she protected at Boulevard Arago were Marek Szwarc, his wife Guina, and their daughter Tereska Torrès; Ruth Domela, wife of César, with their two daughters; and a Jewish couple from Vienna, Bruno Beran and Irene Subaková.

When warned of an imminent raid, Ruth and César Domela would temporarily hide in the countryside, while Laurain’s information enabled Bruno and Irena Beran to flee France via the Pyrenees and eventually reach safety in New York. Szwarc left to serve in the Polish army in exile in Scotland, and his wife and daughter, Tereska Torrès, escaped to England, where the latter was one of the first women to join the Free French Forces.

On 3 November 1986, Israel's official memorial to the Jewish victims of the Holocaust recognised Berthe Laurain as Righteous Among the Nations for her efforts in saving Jewish artists and families during World War II.

== Long-term residents (1945-1970) ==
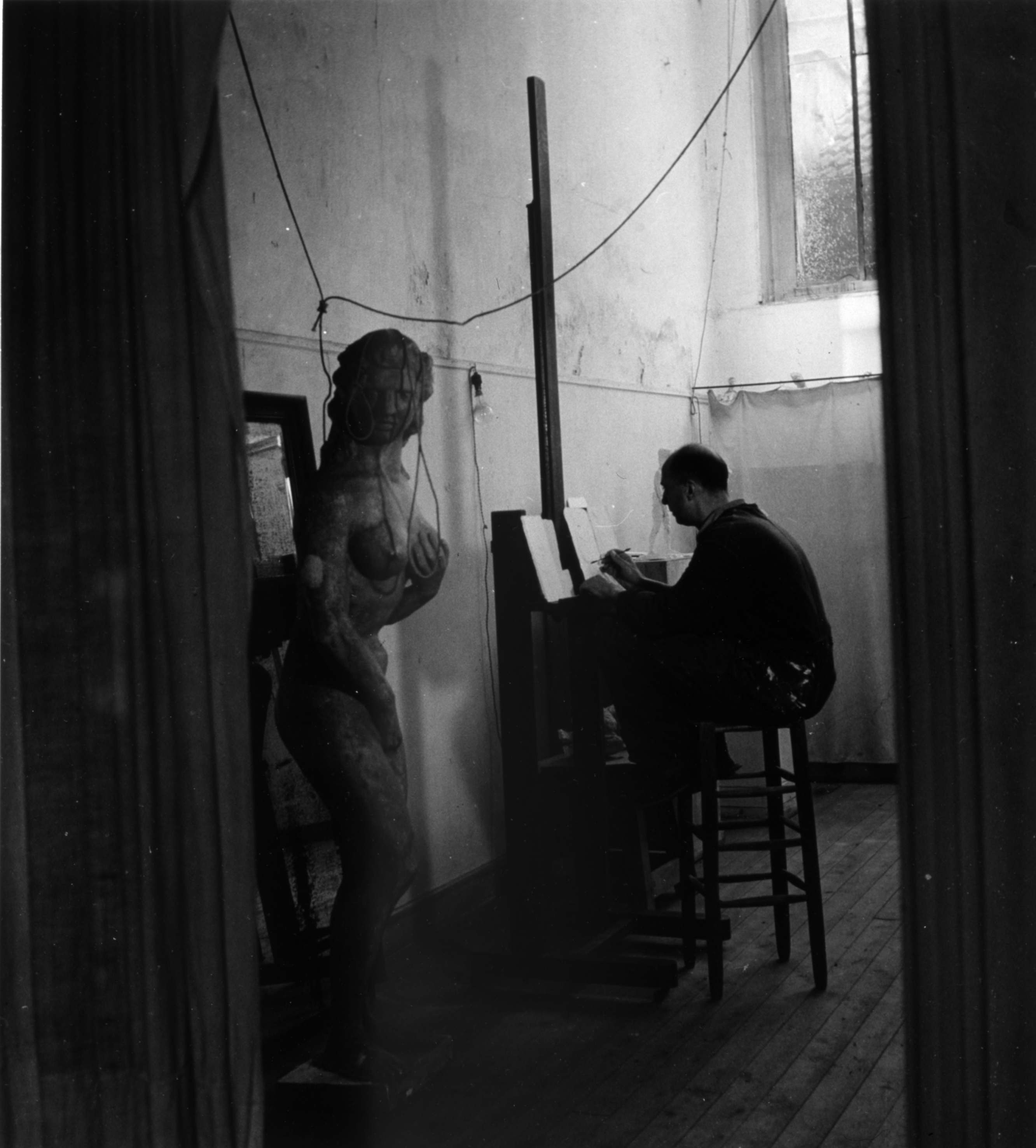
Emmanuel Auricoste at work.

Unlike some Parisian studio complexes, the Cité Fleurie developed a stable community of long-term residents. Artists who had been resident before the War reestablished themselves following the Liberation, maintaining a lasting presence in the community.

Marek Szwarc and Guina Markova returned to studio 13 of the complex after the Liberation, living out their lives. Their daughter, the writer Tereska Torrès, stayed at her childhood studio of the Cité Fleurie until her death in 2012.

Artists such as Boris Anrep, Gaston Balande and Richard Reimans, who had arrived during the Belle Époque, also remained until long after World War II. Anrep and Balande worked at Boulevard Arago until their respective deaths in 1969 and 1971, while Reimans' studio was kept by his widow until 1974.

Other veteran members of the Cité Fleurie after the War include Rodin's bronze expert Jean Élie Auguste Limet, who was still assisting sculptors at the complex in the 1950s and died in his studio in 1965.

A survey of the artists living at the Cité fleurie in 1973 observed that many so-called "newcomers" had actually been residents for decades. Among these were the Dutch-born abstract artist César Domela; sculptor and teacher Emmanuel Auricoste; National Prize-winning sculptor Marcel Chauvenet; artist couple Georges Armand Lacroix and Elizabeth Klein-Lacroix; and the realist painter Henri Cadiou, all of whom had arrived in the 1930s.

Other figures still resident at the time of the 1973 article who had arrived many decades prior were the sculptor Emmanuel Cavacos still living in studio 25 and the Lithuanian sculptor Arbit Blatas.

Many of these figures who had known the Cité fleurie for decades played a key role in protecting it from demolition.

== Threats and preservation ==
The Cité fleurie in 2026.

From the 1950s, the Cité fleurie faced the prospect of demolition, as developers sought to acquire the property and construct a large apartment block in its place. Resident artists initially responded with a protest exhibition.

In the early 1970s, tenants discovered the property was being sold and mobilised more broadly to protect the complex. On 24 February 1970, artist residents including Georges Armand Lacroix and Henri Cadiou founded an association to protect the colony, with Lacroix serving as president and Cadiou as treasurer. (Note: The Association des artistes du 65 Boulevard Arago pour la sauvegarde des ateliers et des jardins (Artists of 65 Boulevard Arago Association for Saving the Studios and Gardens).) Sculptor Marcel Chauvenet acted as secretary, and architect Henri Calsat provided technical advice for the campaign. The group used Lacroix’s studio as their headquarters, where they drafted press releases, leaflets, petitions and coordinated legal and public actions to oppose the redevelopment.

On 24 March 1971, a company was granted planning permission to demolish the Cité fleurie and construct a ten-storey residential building on the site. Campaigners were told that no action could be taken to save the studios as, at that time, they were not subject to any form of protection.

After a long struggle, including an intervention from President Giscard d'Estaing, the site was finally preserved. In May 1994, façades, roofs, and the ground of the plot were officially protected under the French heritage registry (Monuments historiques).

== Selected works depicting the Cité fleurie ==
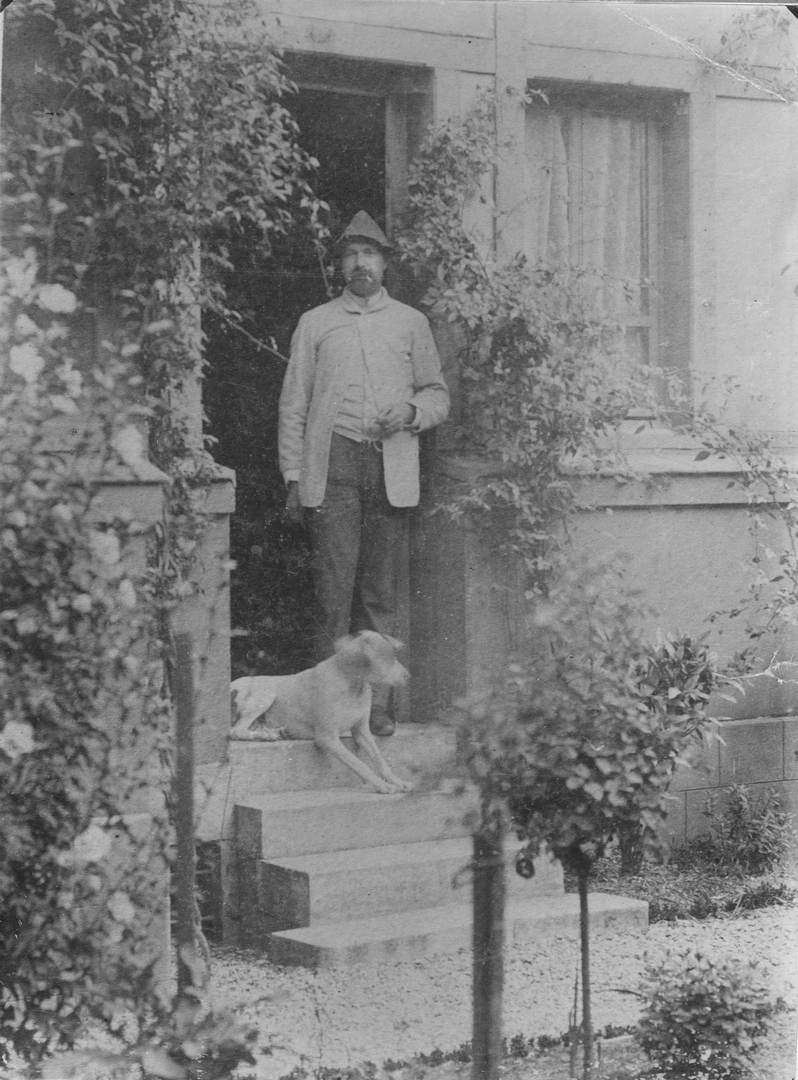
Per Hasselberg in front of his studio around 1889.

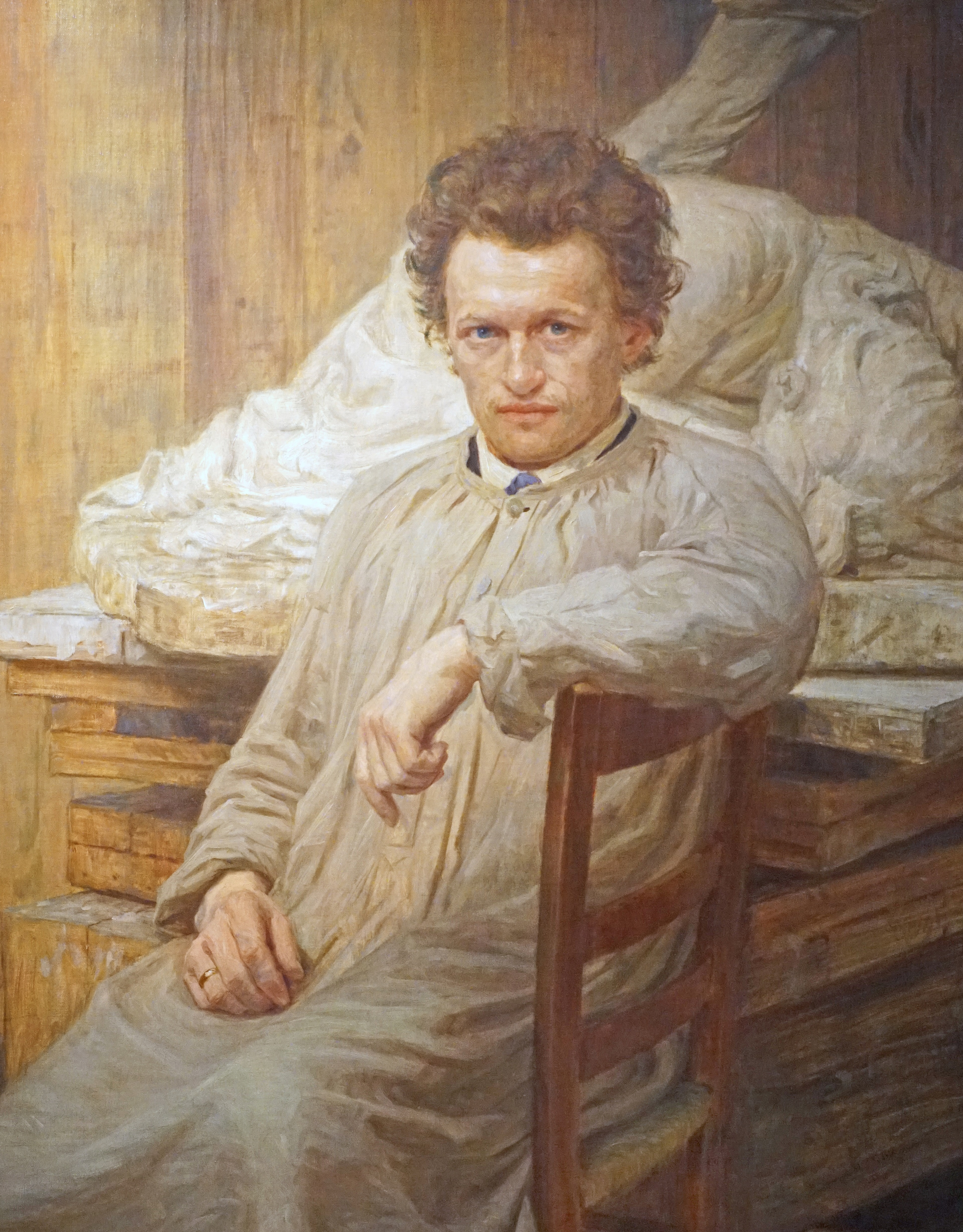
Axel Hou's portrait of Niels Hansen Jacobsen in his Boulevard Arago studio.

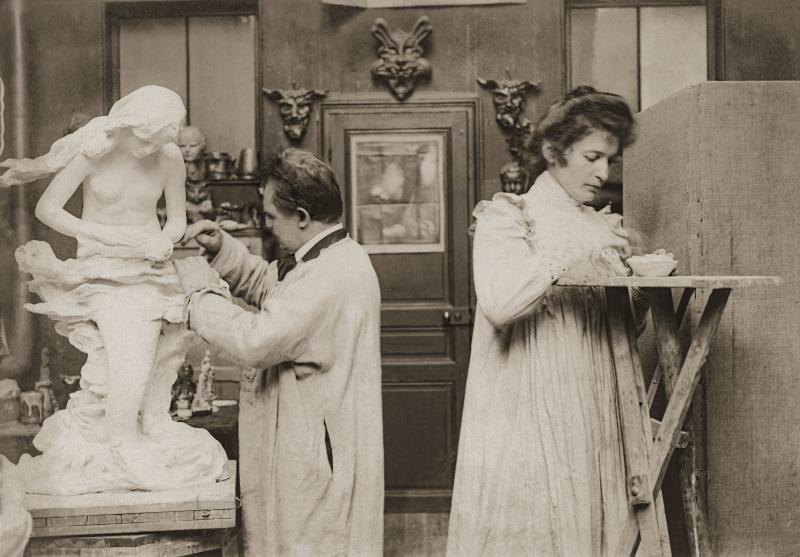
Niels Hansen Jacobsen and Anne Gabriele Rohde at the Cité fleurie.

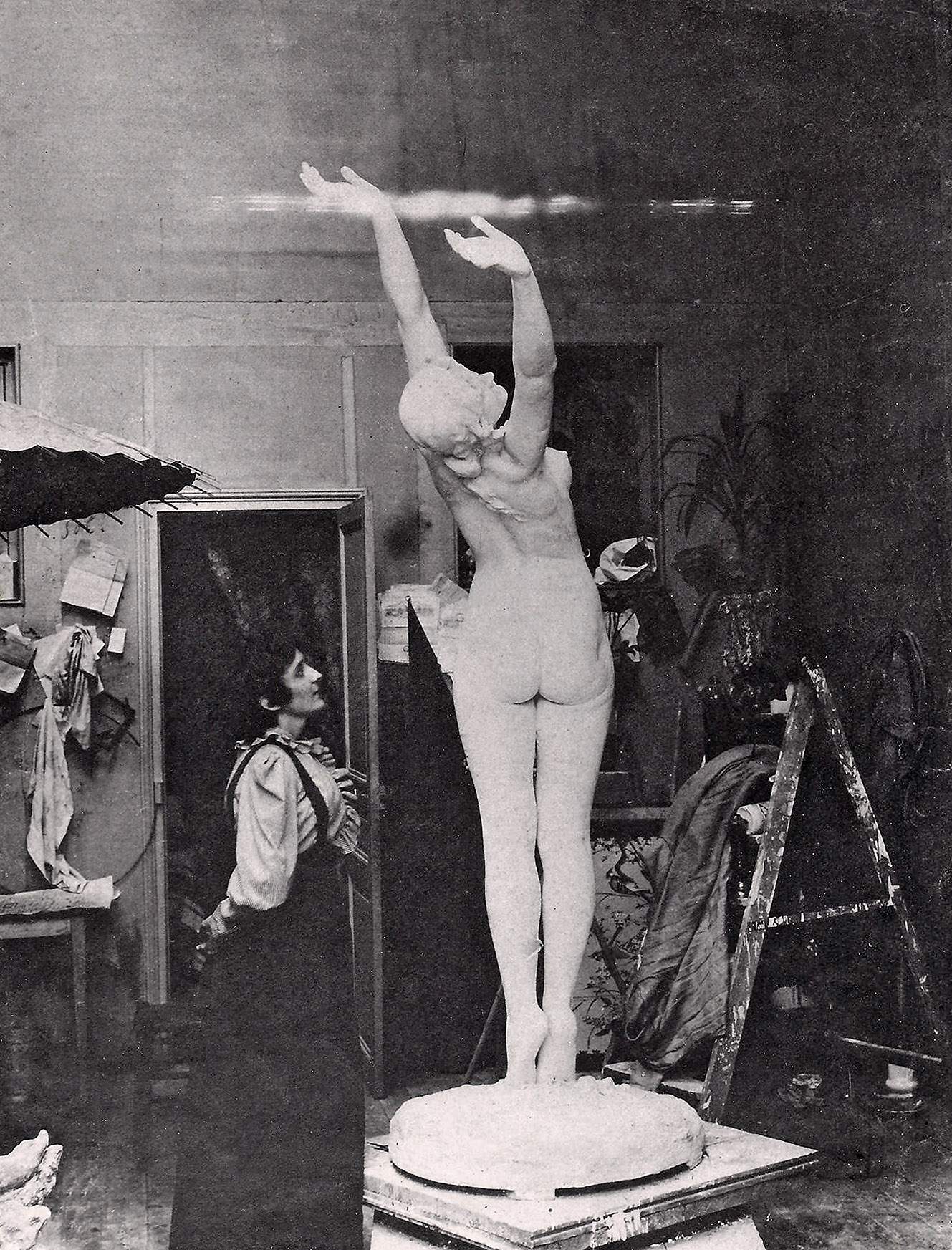
Menga Schjelderup with Axel Ebbe's Sunflower.

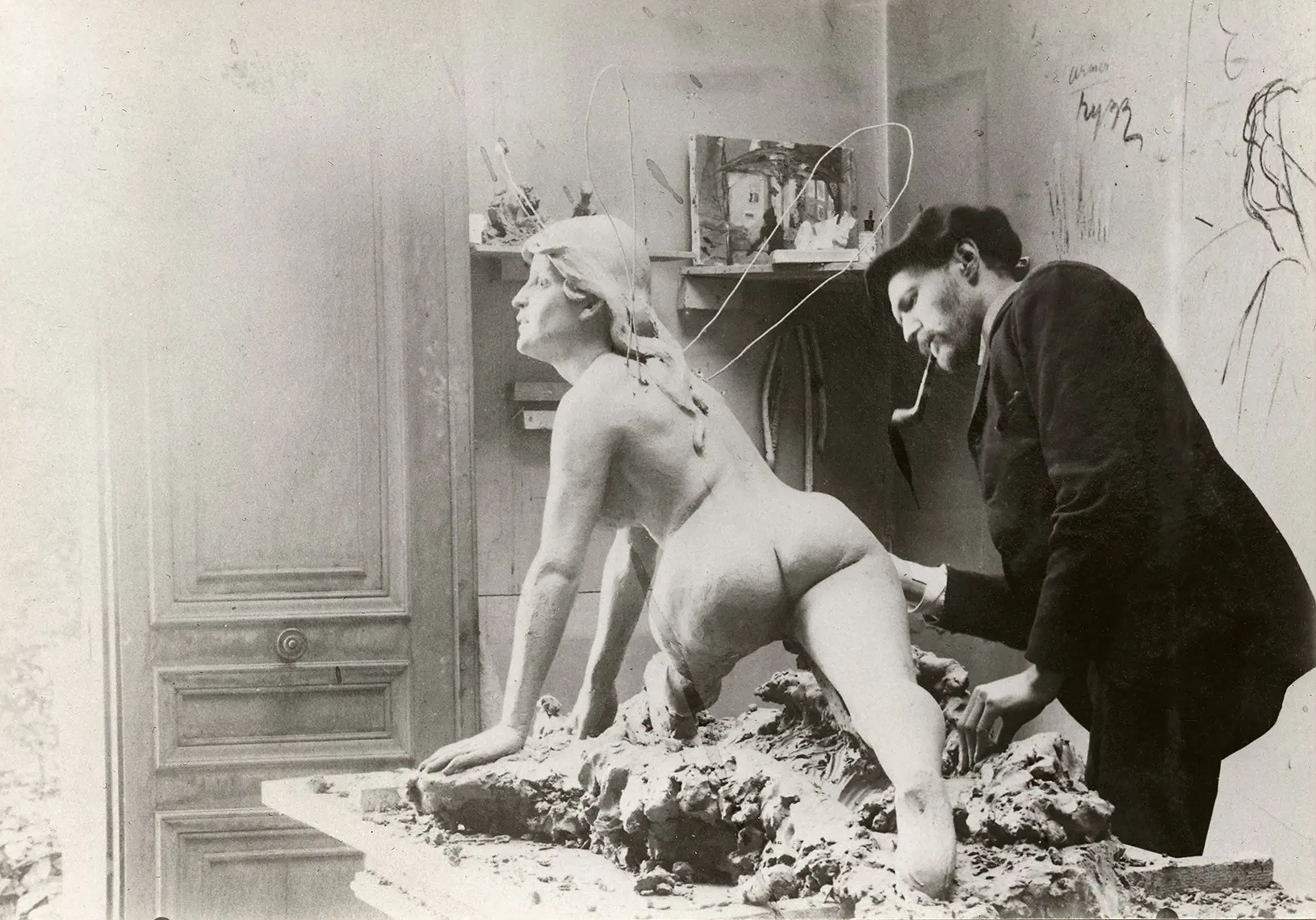
Axel Ebbe with Menga Schjelderup's sculpture Papillon in clay around 1893.

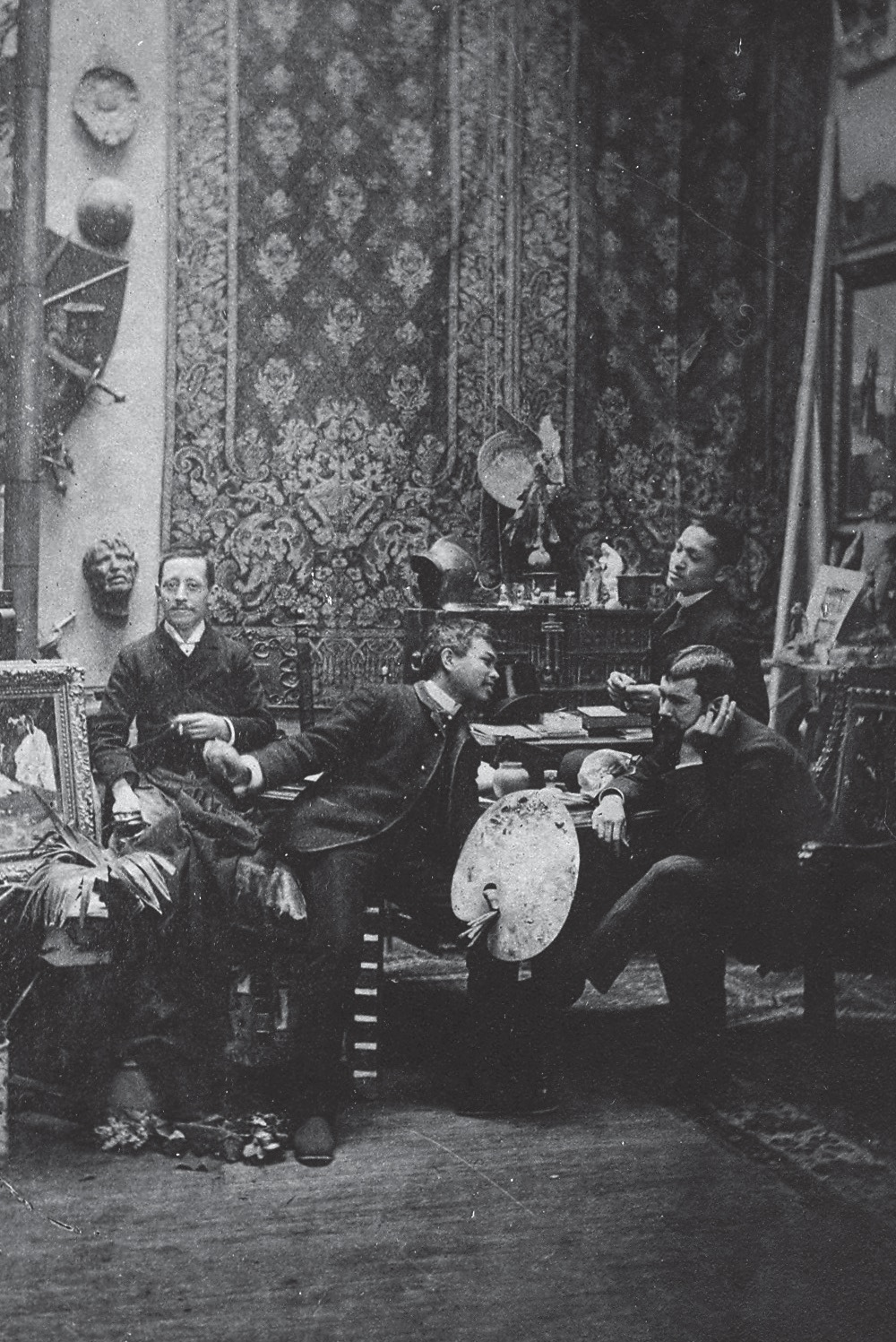
Members of los Indios Bravos in Juan Luna's studio at the Cité fleurie.

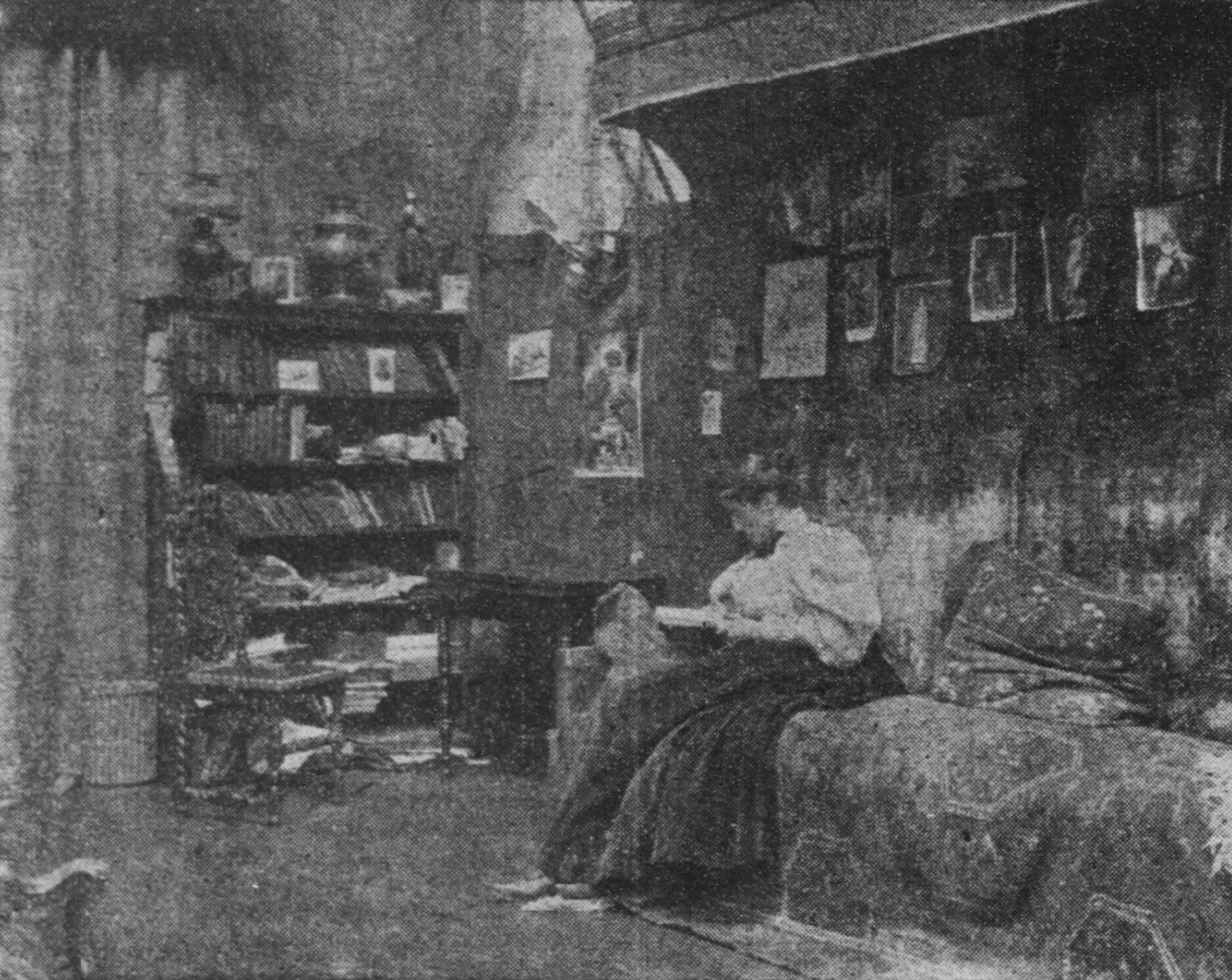
Elizabeth Case Harwood in her studio around 1901.

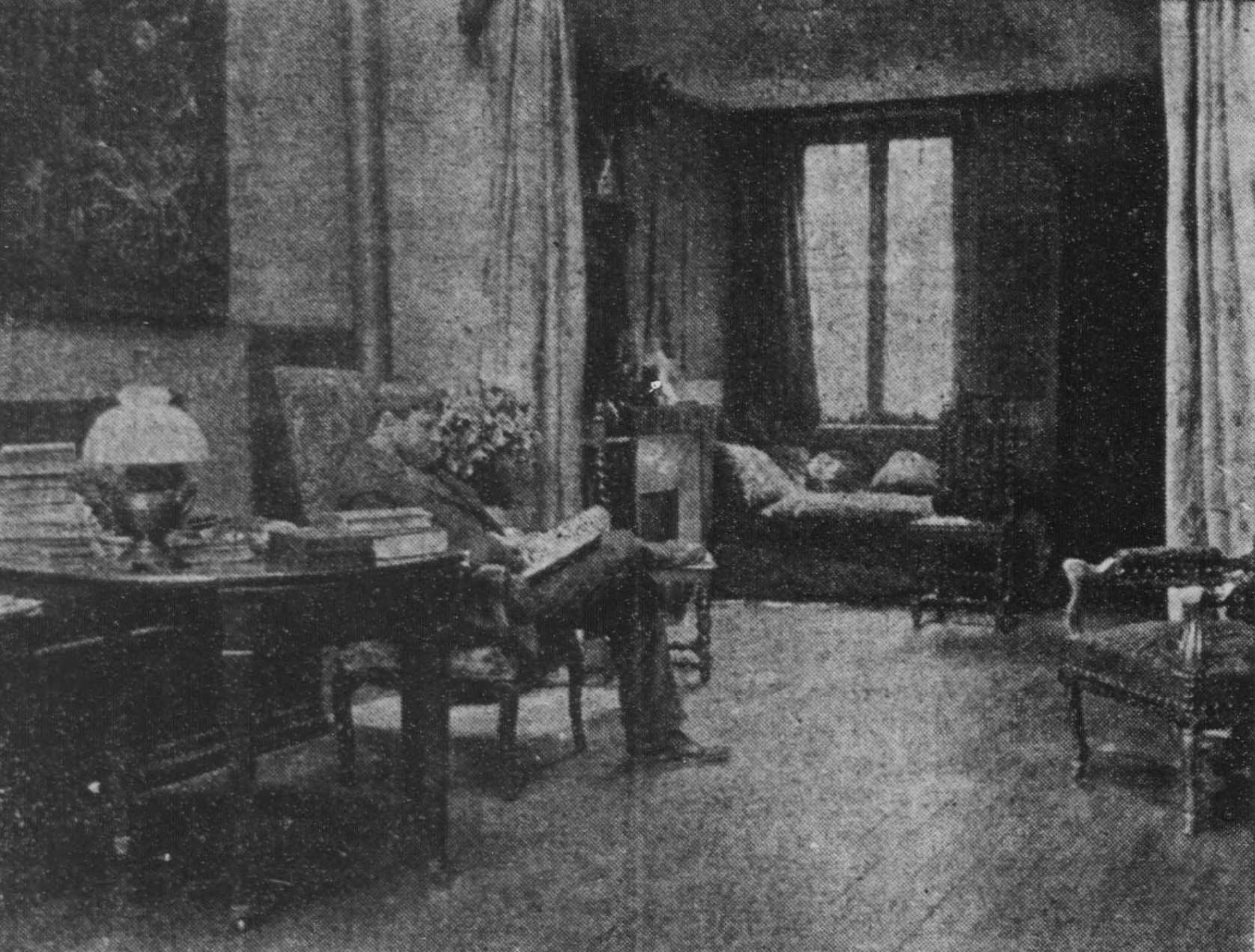
Burt Harwood at the Cité fleurie around 1901.

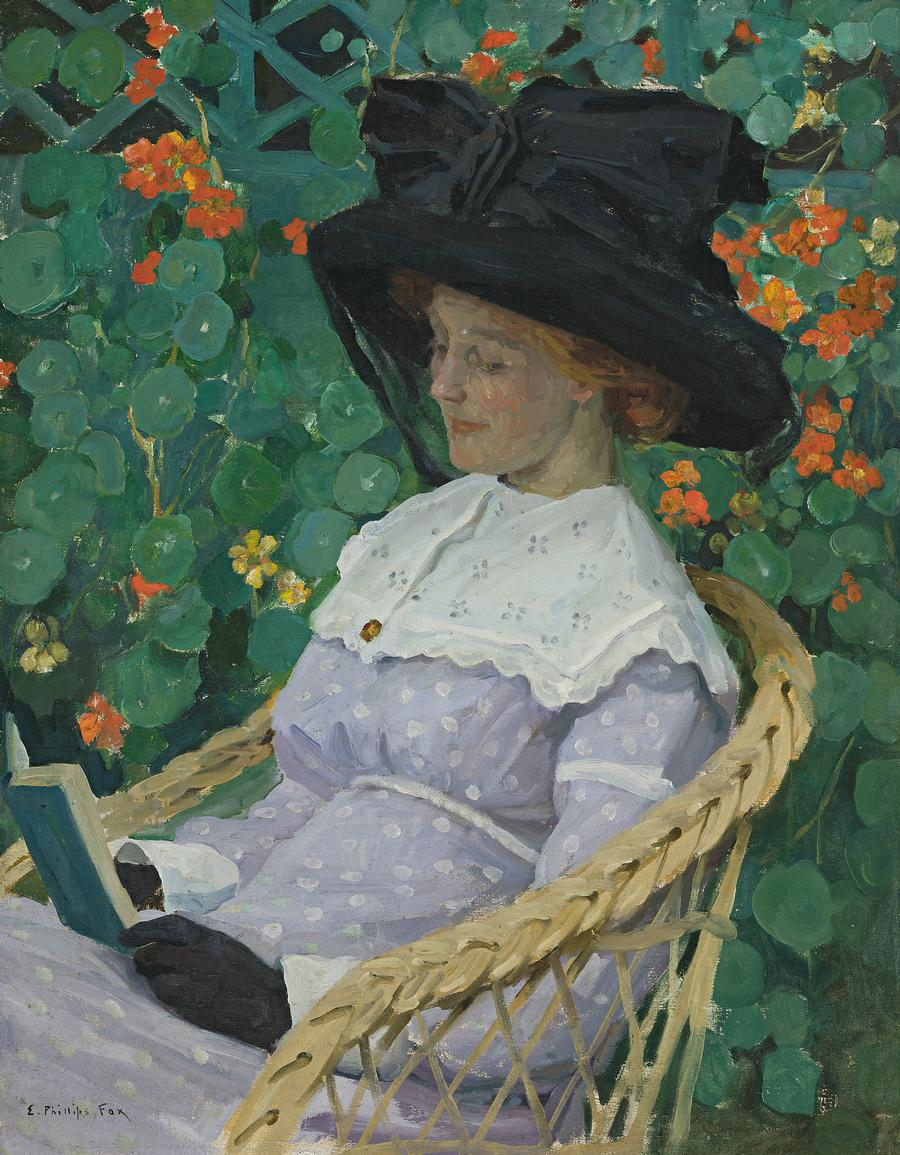
Nasturtiums by E. Phillips Fox, showing neighbour Edith Susan Gerard Anderson.

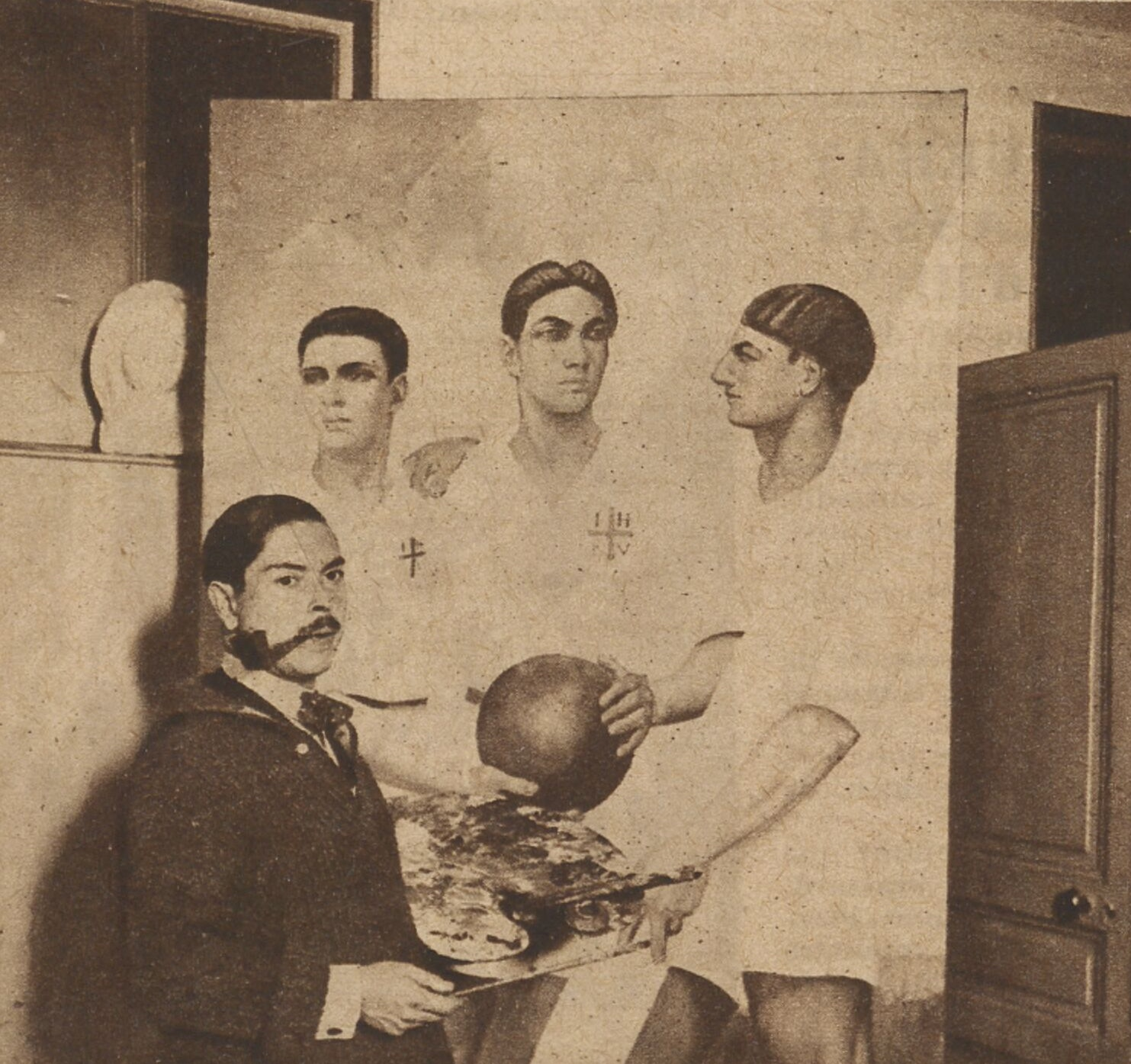
Ángel Zárraga in his studio at the Cité fleurie around 1927.

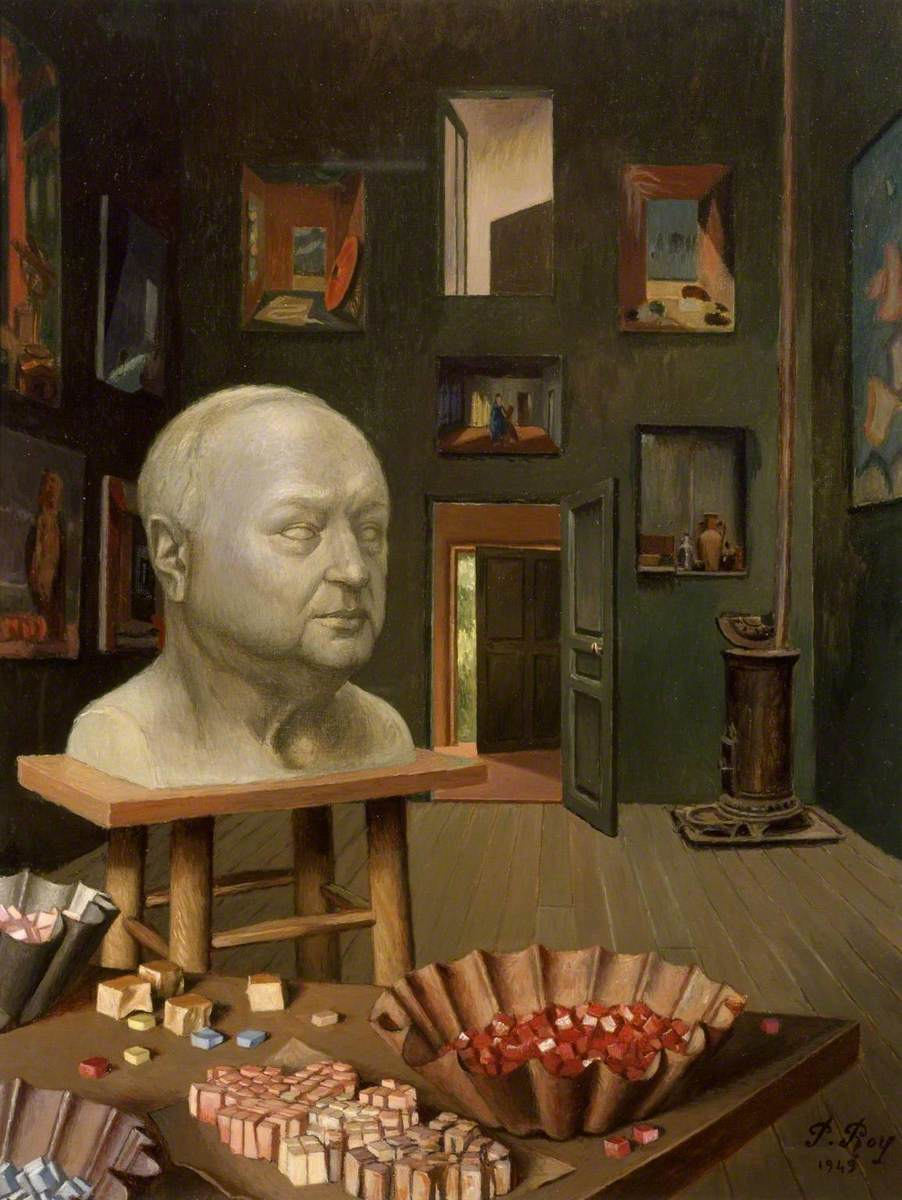
Boris Anrep's studio at the Cité fleurie by Pierre Roy.

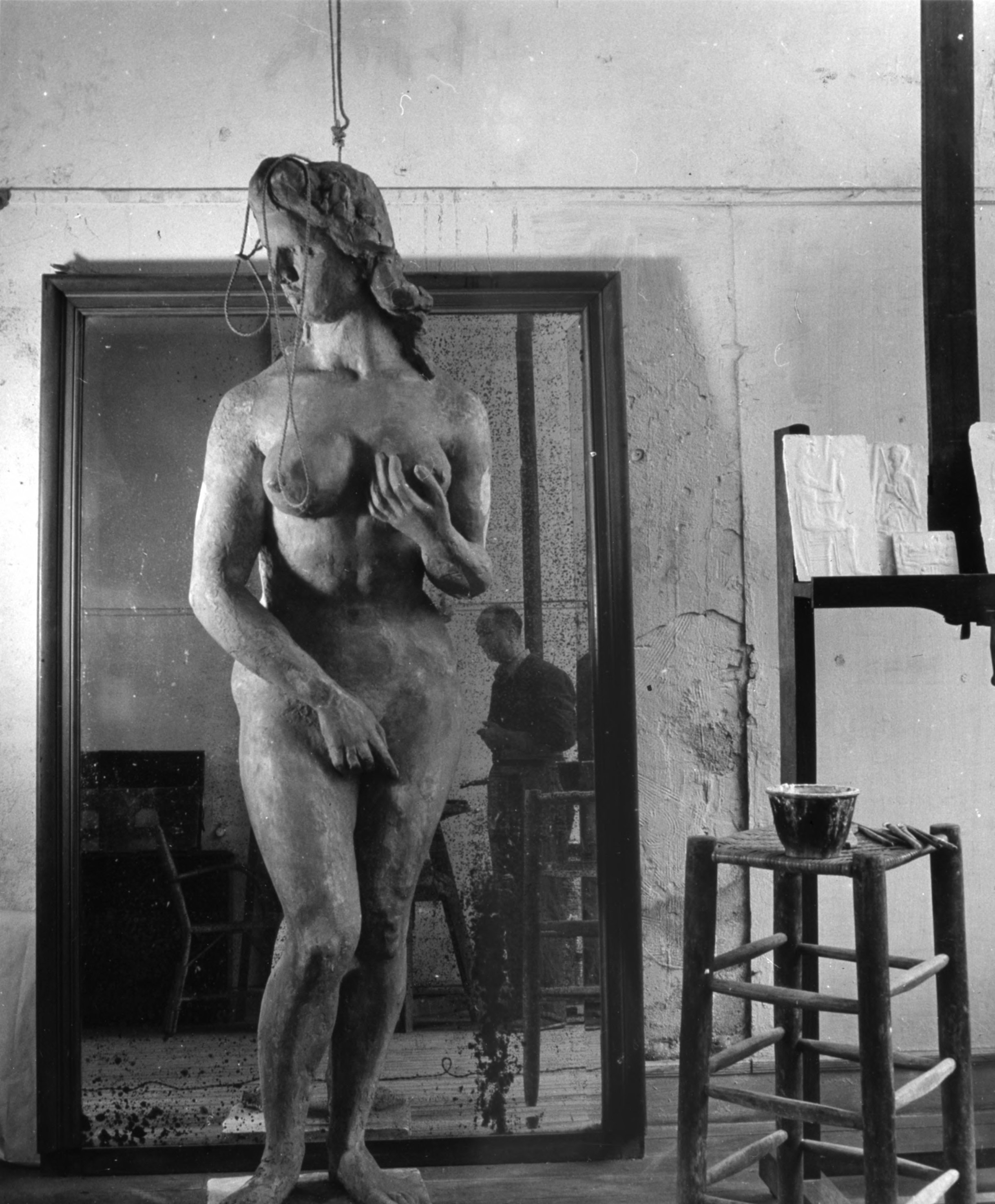
Emmanuel Auricoste in his studio.

== Other artists of the Cité fleurie ==
Besides the figures mentioned above, the studio complex on Boulevard Arago hosted many other artists:

- Fréderic-Ernest Renaudot - sculptor
- Carl Larsson - painter
- Jean-Baptiste Germain - sculptor
- Frances Pike Kirke Keller - painter
- Ernest-Charles-Molière Jetot - sculptor
- Thomas Cromwell Corner - painter
- Verner Åkerman - sculptor
- Herbert Adams - sculptor
- Marius Michel - painter
- Henri Peinte - sculptor
- Gustave Allemand - painter
- Auguste Frizon - sculptor
- James-Camille Lignier - painter
- Johanne Nejberg - sculptor
- Paul Ange Nocquet - sculptor
- Antonin-Clair Forestier - sculptor
- Jos Croin - painter
- Jeanne Otto - painter
- Michel Léonard Béguine - sculptor
- Pierre Gourdault - painter
- Armand-Auguste
- Rasmus Harboe - sculptor
- Rodolphe Weisse - sculptor
- Edgar-Henri Boutry - sculptor
- Jeanne Berg - painter
- George Bridgman – sculptor (studio 27)
- Charles Damour - painter
- Étienne Corot - sculptor
- Axel Hou - painter
- Carl Johan Bonnesen - sculptor
- Annemarie and Carl Nielsen - composer
- Jens Lund - painter
- Henriette Hahn-Brinckmann - painter and lithographer
- Johannes Holbeck - illustrator
- Oscar Mathiesen - painter
- Rudolph Tegner - sculptor
- Anna Gabriele Rohde - sculptor
- Henri Montassier - painter
- Alméry Lobel-Riche - painter
- Tom von Dreger - painter
- Maurice Pillard-Verneuil - decorative artist
- Richard Bergh - painter
- Theodosia Durand - painter
- Isaac Lichtenstein - painter
- Viatcheslav Garine - sculptor
- Benno Elkan - sculptor
- Julius Steiner - sculptor
- Joan Berg - painter
- Henry Varnum Poor - designer
- Lee F. Hersch - painter
- Henri de Kat
- Charles Alers - engineer
- Howard Morton Hartshorne
- Serge Benoit - sculptor
- William Thorne - painter (studio 23)
- Florence Brevoort Kane - sculptor
- Armand Vergeaud - painter
- Gabriel Dufrasne - sculptor
- Carlos C Drake
- William-Eggleston Poucher - painter
- Jean Célestin Danguy - painter
- Paul Domergue - painter
- Marthe Abram - painter
- F.C.B. Cadell - painter
- Edith Susan Boyd - painter
- Henri Calsat - architect
- William Ernest Chapman - painter
- Albert Sterner - illustrator and painter
- Marie Martin-Gourdault - painter
- Frederick Judd Waugh - painter
- Madeleine Ponelle-Deruas - painter
- Patrick Henry Bruce - painter
- Sylvain Pitt - teacher
- Robert Klippel - sculptor
- Bruno Beran - painter
- Phelan Gibb
- Tony van Hoegaerden - painter
- Léonard-Albert Barret
- George Barne - painter
- Umberto Brunelleschi - painter
- Helen Mouravieff
- Aurain Diamand
- Lydia Demenkova
- Evert Ekker - painter
- Kurt Edzard - sculptor
- Paul Hamann - sculptor
- Seraphina Loubouschkine
- Charles Péquin
- Rodolphe-Théophile Bosshard
- Bernhard Gutmann - painter
- Georges Lapchine - painter
- Kurt Tuch - painter
- Louis Neillot - painter
- Juliette Chopin - painter (daughter of resident Louis Neillot)
- Elisabeth Chauvenet - sculptor (daughter of resident Maurice Chauvenet)
- André Delauzières - painter (son of resident Gaston Balande)
- Marcel Nicolle - curator
- Léon Lenud
- Marcel Mouillot - painter
- Herbert Van Blarcom Acker - painter
- Ernest Yarrow Jones - painter
- Louis Ridel - painter
- Alfred Cohen - painter
