= Mary Stewart Gibson =

Scottish artist and painter

- Born: Mary Stewart Gibson; 21 February 1904; Longridge, West Lothian, Scotland
- Died: 5 March 1989 (age 85); L'Hôpital Broca, Paris, France
- Occupations: Artist, painter

Mary Stewart Gibson (21 February 1904 – 5 March 1989) was a Scottish artist, who spent most of her life living and working in Paris.

== Early life and education ==
Mary Gibson was born in Longridge, West Lothian, Scotland in 1904, the second daughter of Reverend John Gibson, minister of the local United Free church, and Mrs. Ellie Brown Gibson. She was a pupil at Bathgate Academy in Bathgate, West Lothian for four years, before studying at Glasgow School of Art.

== Life in Paris ==
In 1923, after the death of her father, Mary Gibson fulfilled a long-standing ambition and moved to Paris, with her mother and sister. She was a student at several studios, in particular that of Emile Renard, and "mixed with the leading artists and intellectuals of the 1920s." Initially, she lived and worked in a studio in the iconic Cité Fleurie on the Boulevard Arago in the 13th arrondissement in Paris, which still exists today. In a 1932 article in the journal of her old school, Mary mentions a "colony of bungalow studios ... with creeping vines, fruit trees and a profusion of greenery and flowers." Artists of multiple nationalities work there, mostly "men of much interest." She feels at home on the left bank of the Seine with its writers, artists and intellectuals and crossing the river is like going "into town."

Gibson later moved to a studio opposite the Santé prison in the adjacent 14th arrondissement. In 1940, following the occupation of Paris, she was arrested as an enemy alien by a French gendarme, "whom she had known for seven years and who promised her tearfully that this outrage ... would be revenged." It is reported that her suitcase was ready and, when the officer in charge observed that she was still smiling, she retorted 'Would you prefer, monsieur, if I wept?" She was interned first at Besançon and then at Vittel, where she was a "chef de bloc" in charge of 350 women inmates, until the camp was liberated in 1944. A trip to Egypt after the war helped her to recover from her ordeal and she subsequently returned to her studio in Paris. A member of the Scots Kirk in Paris, she was a "great friend" of Dr. Donald Caskie, the Tartan Pimpernel, who was minister there both before and after the war.

== Mary Gibson's art ==
Gibson was "a prominent member of the second generation of Scottish colourists." As early as 1926, she had a painting accepted for that year's Salon in Paris, the city's main annual art exhibition. It was a portrait of an old peasant woman. In 1932, her work was exhibited at the spring Salon of the Société Nationale des Beaux Arts. She also exhibited her work at one of the Salons of the Artistes Français, at the Galeries Georges Petit in 1929, and in the annual exhibitions of the Indépendants. After the Second World War, she continued to exhibit regularly in Scotland and Paris, in particular at the Art Centre, Edinburgh in 1955 during that year's Festival, at the Wall Studio in Edinburgh in 1960 and 1963, and at the D&F Gallery in Edinburgh in 1966 and 1970. Mary travelled extensively, finding subject matter in Holland, Switzerland, Spain, Egypt, Italy, and many parts of France; island settings were a special favourite of hers.

At the time of Gibson's exhibitions in Edinburgh, her work was favourably reviewed by several critics. In 1955, a writer in The Scotsman commented that Gibson was an "objective painter" of considerable technical skill, both sensitive and charming. The poet and artist Sydney Goodsir Smith wrote in 1963 that her street scenes were done "with affection but without sentimentality", and that she "sets down exactly what she sees before her". In 1966, the same critic mentioned her "picturesque landscapes", finding that she was good at sunlight, her favourite subject, and olive trees. In 1970, The Scotsman's art critic, Edward Gage, also wrote that her work was "picturesque", and praised her "positive sincerity, charm and lack of pretentiousness."

== Life in the community ==
Mary Gibson was well known as a raconteur, and, with her sparkling personality, hosted parties for her friends of many nationalities at her Paris studio. According to an article in The Scotsman in 1977, she was "a cornerstone of the Scots community and a causeway into the French one." One writer records that, among other things, she was an expert maker of pancakes both à l'écossaise and suzette, so much so that one visitor returned the next day to see if there were any left, at what became known as the "Left Bank Embassy."

Mary died on 5 March 1989 at L'Hôpital Broca in Paris. A memorial service was held for her at the Scots Kirk in the same city on 6 April 1989. Her obituary in The Scotsman entitled "Painter of Quality" observed that her works had the key attribute of all good painting: "One never tires of them."
