= Marie Martin-Gourdault =

French painter

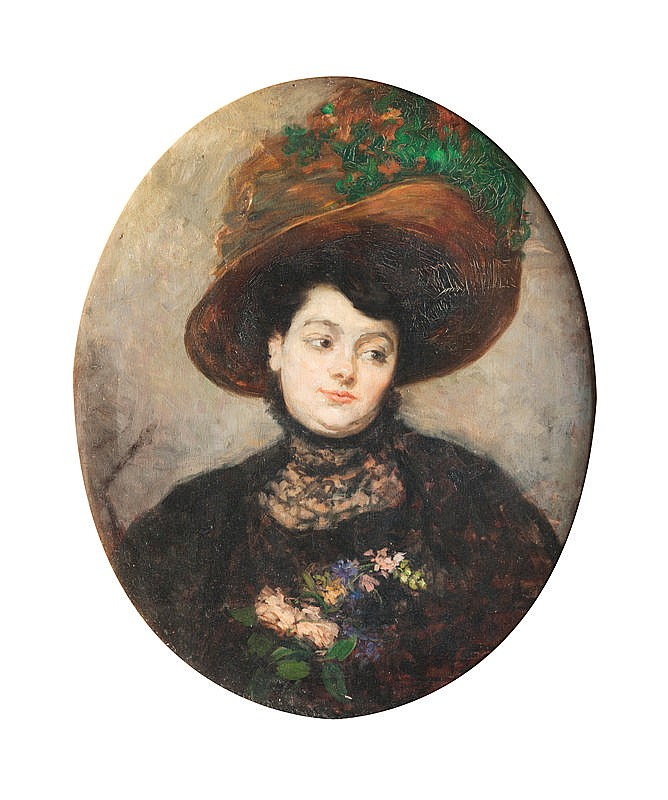
Portrait of Marie Martin-Gourdault by Pierre Gourdault.

Marie Martin-Gourdault (née Anastasie Prudence Marie Martin, 1881–1937) was a French painter known for her Orientalist subjects. She was a sociétaire of the Salon des artistes français and exhibited there hors concours (without competition).

== Early life and training ==
Martin-Gourdault was born to Hyacinthe Firmin Désiré Martin and Marie-Louise Sapin in Saint-Pardoux, Deux-Sèvres, on 27 November 1881. She came to Paris and studied under portrait painter Marcel Baschet. Her husband, Pierre Gourdault, was another student of Baschet and also gave her instruction in painting.

After the couple's marriage on 25th July 1910, Martin-Gourdault moved to the artists' colony at 65 boulevard Arago. She began exhibiting at the Salon des artistes français in 1911 and was noted for her work from the outset.

== Career ==
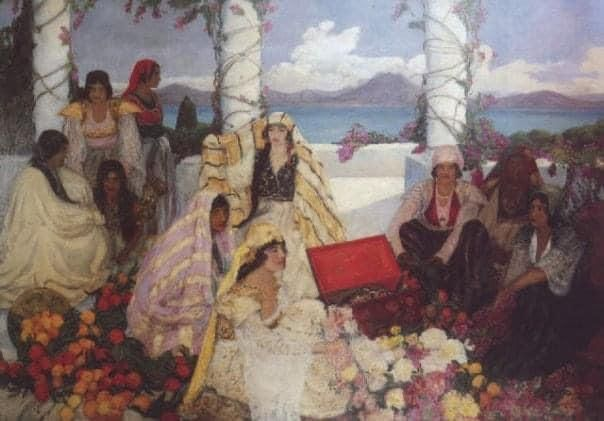
Fiançailles dans le golfe de Carthage, winner of the gold medal in painting at the 1923 Salon des artistes français.

Martin-Gourdault specialised in Orientalist subjects, inspired by her numerous travels through Spain and North Africa in the early 20th century. A noted colourist, she was particularly drawn to the qualities of light and colour she encountered in Tunisia, where she and her husband built a house in 1912.

After the move and her husband's untimely death at the end of World War I, Martin-Gourdault continued to exhibit in Paris, particularly at the Salon des artistes français, where her work received several awards.

Martin-Gourdault died near Carthage in late 1937. News of her death reached Europe early the following year, which has led to her being erroneously listed as having died in 1938 in some sources.

== Exhibitions and awards ==
Martin-Gourdault exhibited regularly at the Salon des artistes français, where she received multiple honours:

- 1911: medal at the Salon
- 1921: silver medal for Femme sur la terrasse
- 1923: gold medal for Fiançailles (Golfe de Carthage); she was placed hors concours and awarded the medal unanimously

Several of her works were acquired by the French State and the City of Paris, and her paintings are held in provincial museums in France as well as international collections.
