= Ernest Yarrow Jones =

British artist

Ernest Yarrow Jones (1872–1951) was a British oil and watercolour painter, sculptor, and illuminator. He exhibited widely in Britain and France, including at the Royal Academy and the Paris Salon, and lived at Black Gable overlooking Hythe, Kent.

== Early life and education ==
Jones was born in Liverpool on 13 July 1872 to Edward Jones, a wealthy Liverpool wholesale tea merchant, and Elizabeth Jane Jones. He grew at Groudd Hall, Cerrigydrudion, North Wales alongside his siblings Helena Jones, Arthur Edward Jones, and Osman Wynne Jones.

Educated at Parkfield Preparatory School and Liverpool College, he matriculated at Pembroke College, Oxford on 26 October 1891 to study law. He was later a member of Inner Temple in London.

After qualifying as a barrister, Jones turned to a career in painting and sculpture. He studied art at the Westminster School of Art and at South Kensington Art School in England, and later at the Académie Julian and the Académie Colarossi in Paris.

== Career ==
Jones developed a love of nature study in childhood which later informed his artistic focus on animals and landscapes. His artistic career began around 1899, his works spanning a range of artistic media, including oil painting, watercolour painting, sculpture, and decorative book art. Strongly influenced by Impressionism, Jones sought to "record the effect of light with extreme accuracy" while not losing the form of the object.

His illustrative work includes The Childhood of Animals (1912) and Apple of Beauty and Discord (1920).

Jones exhibited in Paris from around 1905, subsequently showing his work at a number of Salons including the Beaux-Arts, the Salon d'Automne and the Salon des Indépendants.

In England he exhibited at the Royal Academy and the W.A.G. and staged one-man shows at the Leicester Galleries, the Arlington Gallery and the Macrae Gallery.

He signed his works “E. Yarrow Jones” in block letters.

== Personal life ==
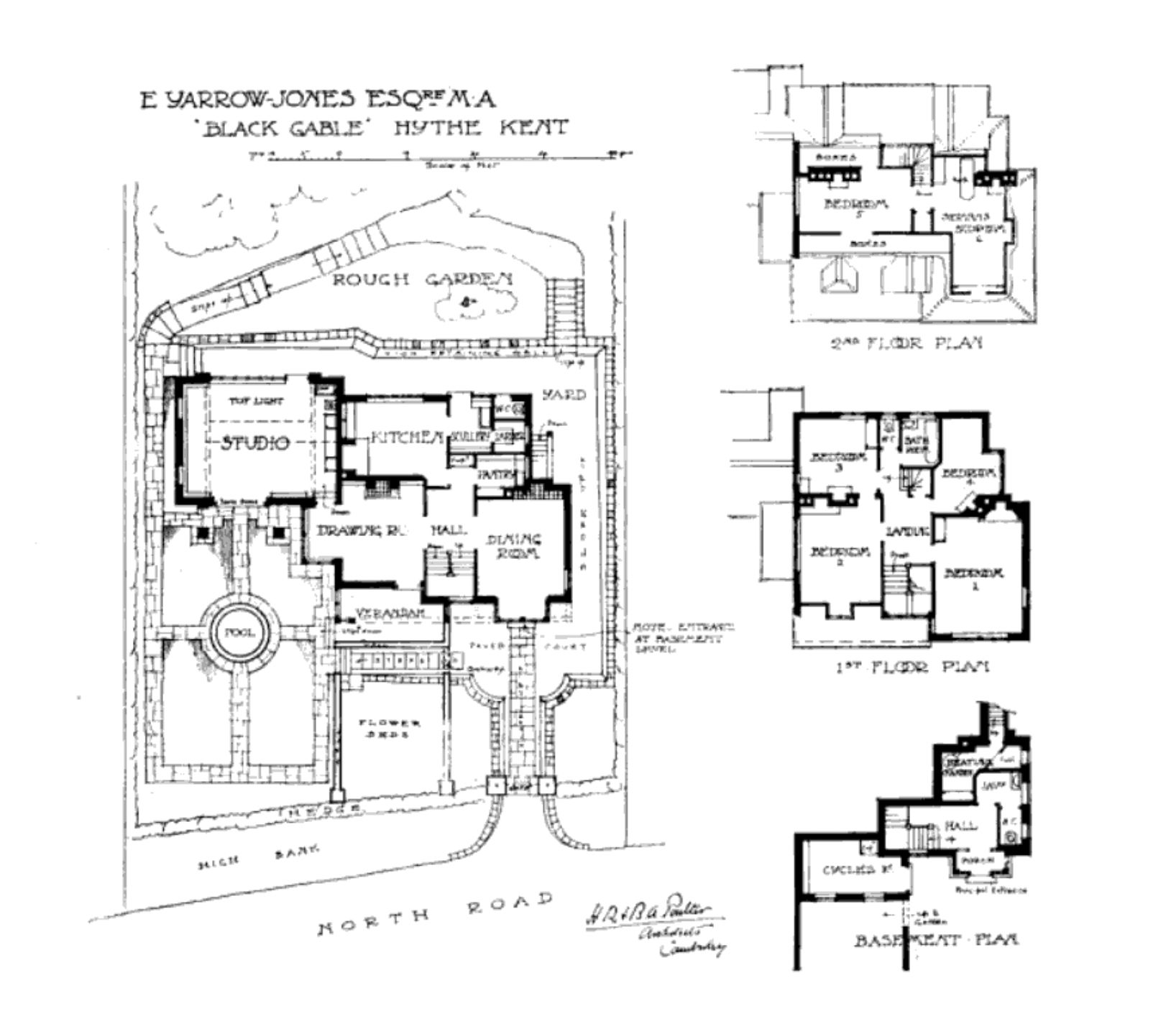
Ernest Yarrow Jones' hillside Arts & Crafts home, Black Gable, including his studio.

In 1905 Jones married childhood friend Mary Poulter with whom he had a daughter, Yvonne Mireille Jones.. Until the 1930s, the couple lived in Hythe, Kent at Black Gable, a hillside Arts & Crafts house they extended in 1909 by commissioning the Poulter brothers, architect father and uncle of Mary Yarrow Jones, to design a large artist's studio, planned to provide a strong north light, a smaller west-facing window for writing, and large south-facing doors to allow work on marble in direct sunlight. The studio opened onto a small formal garden with an ancient well, flagstone paths and terrace walls.

Originally Black Gable was built around 1900 for the Shropshire landowner Ernest Maunoir Harington (1860-1936) to the designs of Arts and Crafts architect Edward Turner Powell FRIBA (1859-1937). Requisitioned by the British Army between 1939 and 1947, Black Gable was bought by the Anglo-Irish widow Mrs. Mary Lynch (1868-1963) and remained in her family until November 2025, following the death of her granddaughter Mrs. Hazel MacKay (1923-2024).

On extended trips to Paris, Jones lived for many years at 65 Boulevard Arago.

In his later years he lived in Exmouth, Devon, where he died in 1951.

== Selected Works ==
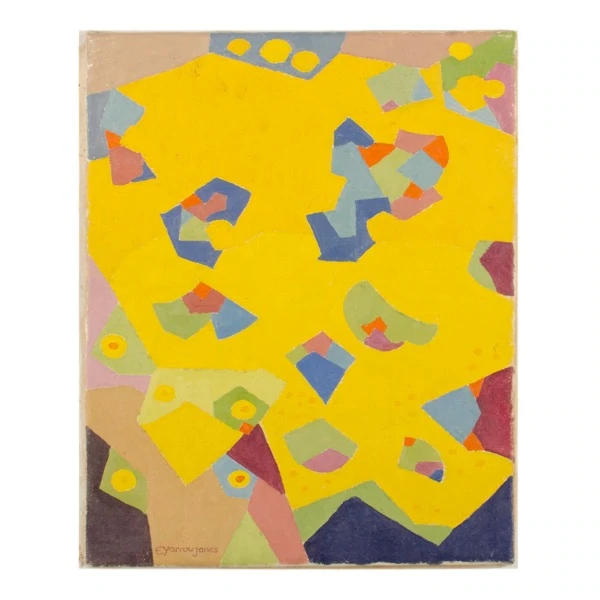
Confetti

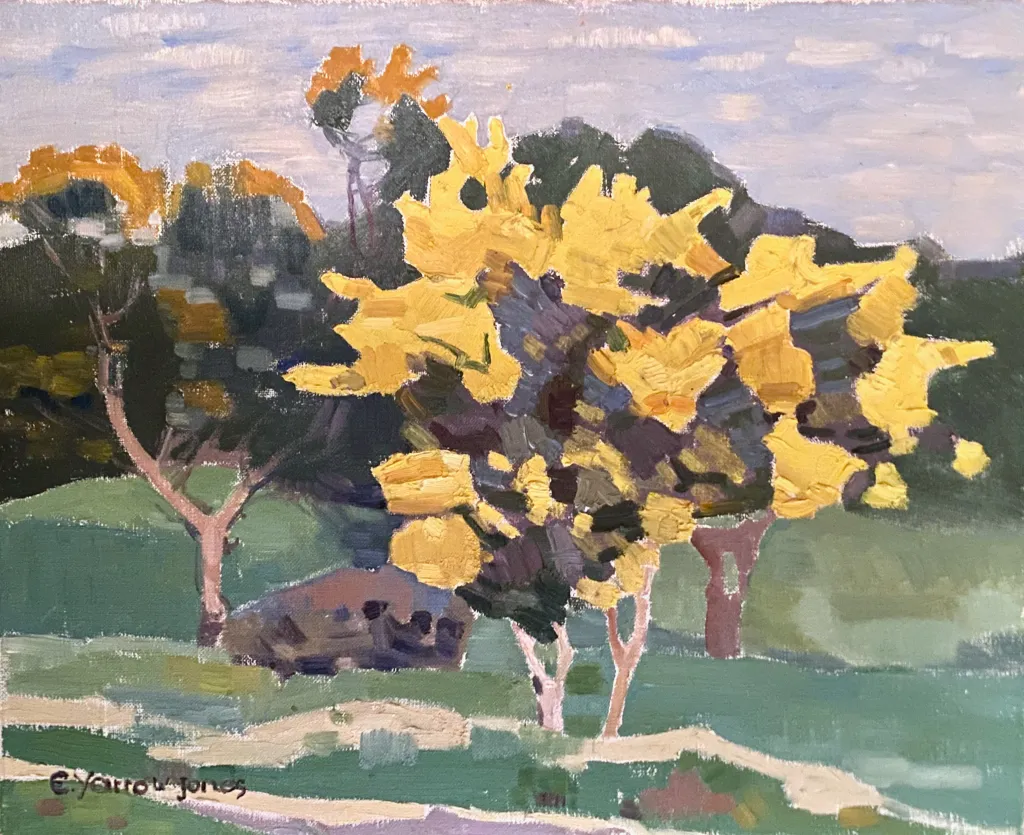
Blossom Trees

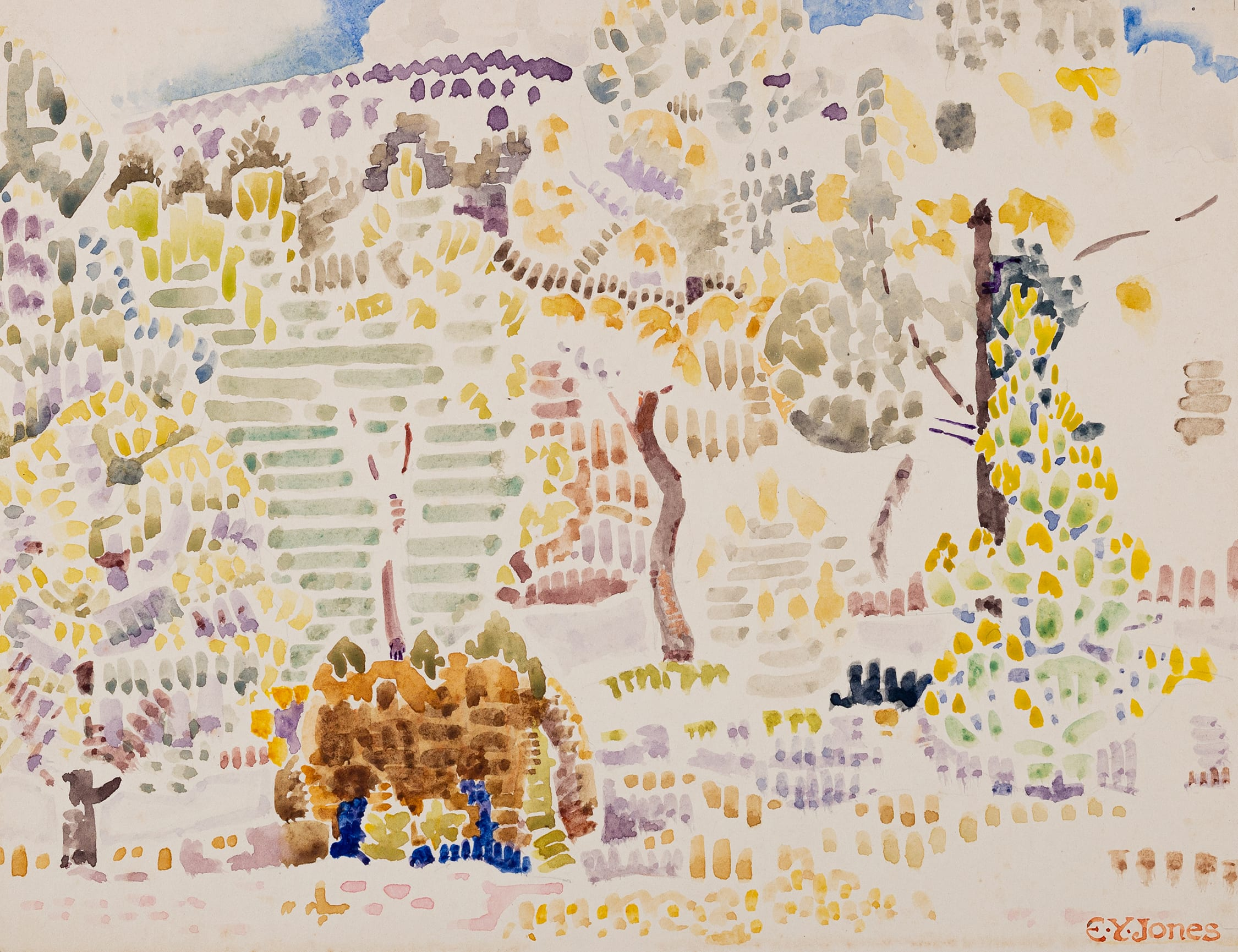
Orchard at Bormes-les-Mimosas, Hyères

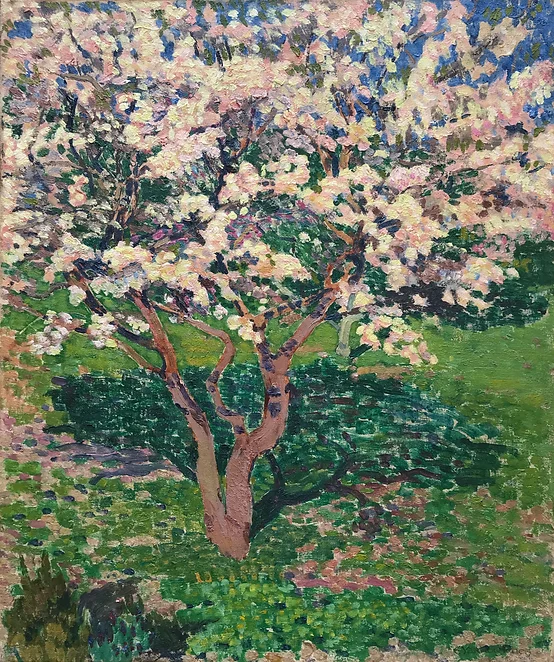
An Almond Tree in Blossom, Corsica

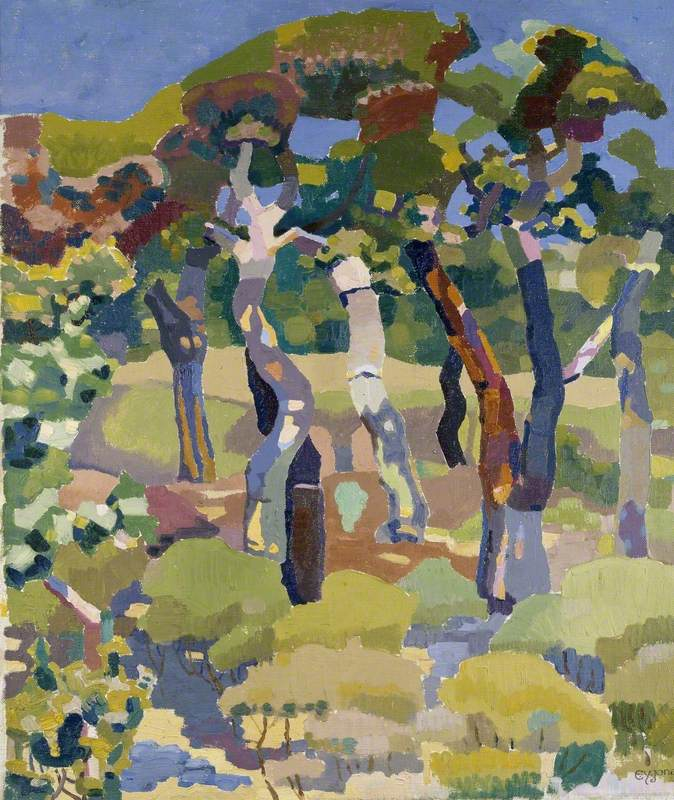
Landscape with Trees
