= Gustave Allemand =

French painter (1846–1888)

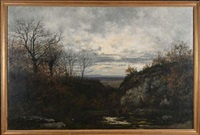
A landscape by Gustave Allemand.

Gustave Allemand (full name Hector Gustave Germain Allemand, 1846–1888) was a French landscape painter and engraver active in the second half of the nineteenth century.

== Biography ==
Born in Lyon on 8 July 1846, Gustave Allemand was the son of Antoinette Françoise Berthaud and Hector Allemand, also a notable landscape painter. Allemand first studied in his father's studio on Quai de la Charité and then, in 1866, enrolled at the École des Beaux-Arts in Lyon where he was taught by Jean-Baptiste Danguin. In Paris Allemand trained with Alexandre Cabanel and Henri Harpignies.

From 1868, Allemand exhibited regularly at the Paris Salon, where his landscape painting earned critical recognition, including an honourable mention in 1882. He was also a member of the Union artistique de Toulouse.

Allemand settled permanently in Paris in the early 1880s, living first in Saint-Germain-des-Prés, and then at the Cité fleurie artists' colony at 65 boulevard Arago. At the Cité fleurie he lived with his wife Marie-Louise Ladrière, whom he married in 1887. Almost exactly a year later, on 20 April 1888, he died in his studio aged 41.

== Works ==
A landscape painter, Gustave Allemand frequently painted scenes of the Isère countryside South-East of Lyon. His paintings were regularly accepted by the Paris Salon, where one of his works, November in the Wood of Mézieu (Novembre dans le bois de Mézieu), received an honourable mention in 1882.

Exhibited at the Paris Salon

- 1868: Interior of the Study of Mr. X (Intérieur du cabinet de M. X.
- 1869: Interior of the Study of Mr. X (Intérieur du cabinet de M. X.)
- 1870: Kitchen Interior (Intérieur de cuisine)
- 1873: A Monk (Un moine)
- 1874: A Monk (Un moine)
- 1875: The Gorges des Trois-Fonds at Hérisson (La gorges des Trois-Fonds à Hérisson)
- 1876: The Oaks of Saint-Julien at Crémieux (Les chênes de Saint-Julien à Crémieux); Landscape, after Hobbema, an etching (Paysage, d'après Hobbema)
- 1877: A Fine December Morning in Crémieux (Une belle matinée de décembre à Crémieux); A Winter Evening in Crémieux (Un soir d'hiver à Crémieux)
- 1878: April in Cernay (Avril à Cernay); October in Crémieux (Octobre à Crémieux)
- 1879: View from the Terrace of the Château Marion in Saint-Génis-Laval (Vue prise de la terrasse du château Marion à Saint-Génis-Laval)
- 1880: The Ambry Valley in Optevoz, Evening (La vallée d'Ambry à Optevoz, soir); The Banks of Ambry in Optevoz, Morning (Les bords d'Ambry à Optevoz, matin)
- 1881: A Winter's Evening in the Ambry Valley (Un soir d'hiver dans la vallée d'Ambry); A September Morning in Châteauvieux-sur-Saran (Une matinée de septembre à Châteauvieux-sur-Saran)
- 1882: November in the Wood of Mézieu (Novembre dans le bois de Mézieu)
- 1883: The Rhone in Mérieu (Le Rhône, à Mérieu)
- 1886: The High Alps, the Bugey and the Rhone in the Mérieu Valley, in Winter (Les grandes Alpes, le Bugey et le Rhône dans la vallé de Mérieu, en frimaire); The Rhone in the gorges de Saint-Alban, in Winter (Le Rhône dans les gorges de Saint-Alban, en frimaire)
- 1887: The Ain at Poncin (L'Ain, à Poncin)

Graphic Works

- Landscape, after Hobbema (Paysage, d'après Hobbema)
- A Monk with a White Beard Sitting at a Table (Un moine à barbe blanche assis à une table)
- View of Lyon, Taken from the Heights (Vue de Lyon, prise des hauteurs)
- Vestibule of My Studio (with a Young Woman Standing, Holding a Glass of Water) (Vestibule de mon atelier (avec une jeune femme debout, tenant un verre d'eau))
- My Study (Mon Cabinet)
- My Kitchen (Ma Cuisine)
- A Street in Crémieu (Une rue à Crémieu)
- The Canal and the Old Church at Crémieu (Le Canal et la vieille Eglise, à Crémieu)
- Fountain of the Capuchins at Crémieu (Fontaine des Capucins, à Crémieu)
- Landscape with a Woman on a Path by a River (Paysage avec une femme sur un chemin le long d'une rivière)
