= Florence Brevoort Kane =

American deaf sculptor (1895–1956)

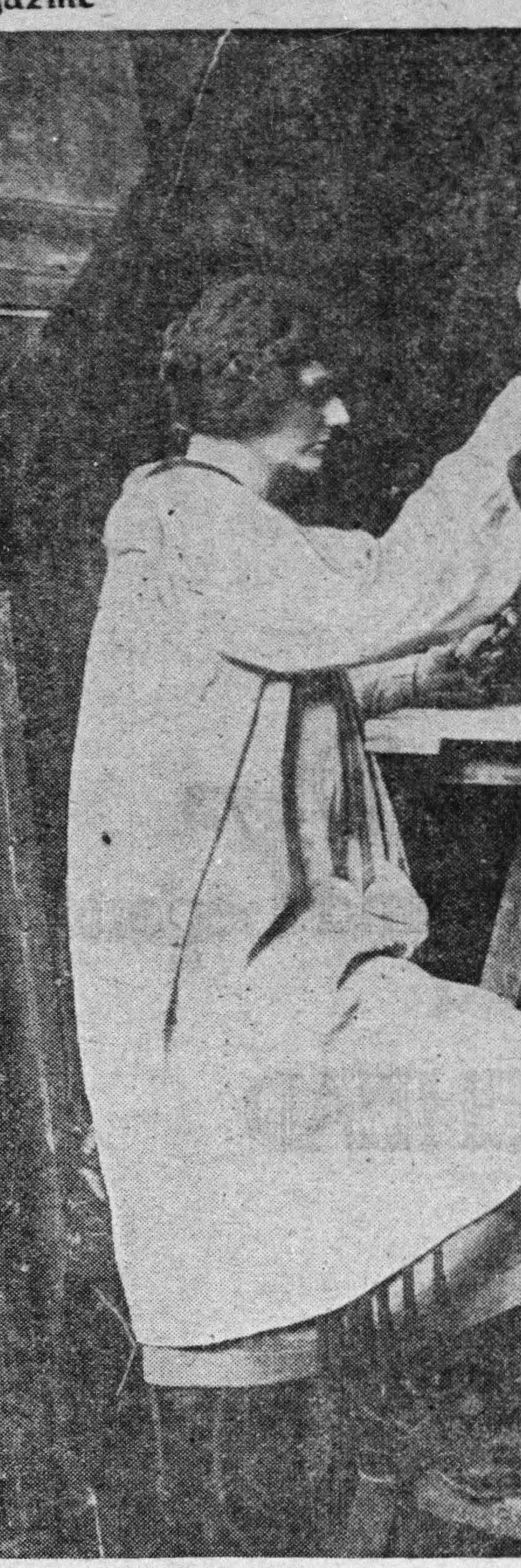
Kane in 1923

Florence Brevoort Kane (January 28, 1895 – November 25, 1956) was an American sculptor who was deaf starting when she was three years old, and she was a sculptor from the 1920s to the 1950s.

== Early life ==
Kane was born in New York City on January 28, 1895. Her parents were Henry Brevoort Kane, who was a descendant of two of the oldest families that settled in New York and who served several terms in the Rhode Island state legislature and Florence Hartshorne Kane. When Kane was three years old, she had contracted spinal meningitis and as a result, she became deaf. Her family went along with the prejudices of the time, and did not teach her how to speak. She was a prolific letter writer, and she would learn how to lip read in quite a few languages. In her youth in Rhode Island, she was very interested in looking over her father's books, particularly one on Ancient Greek sculpture. When she was 16, she used clay to create a figure of a blacksmith working. Her parents then decided to send her to study under Solon Borglum. She would study under Borglum for five years.

== Paris 1919-1939 ==
Kane's bust of James K. Hackett as Macbeth, 1923

Kane would move to Paris in 1919 when she was 24 years old. She would learn from Alexandre Descatoire and she would become known for her busts of horses and African men and of the future King Edward VIII as 1923 newspaper articles would attest.

Kane's fame increased in 1927 when the city of Aix-les-Bains when she was selected among many French sculptors to design a monument of French poet Alphonse de Lamartine. Over the next three years, she'd exhibit four works that won her praise from art critics: Chasseur Alpin, an eight-foot-tall bronze work; Buste Marbre, a woman's head in marble; Grand'mere, a bronze bas-relief; and Groupe de Polo, a bronze work that showed polo ponies and riders. The overall excellence of Kane's oeuvre won her a bronze medal in 1932 from Salon des Artistes Francais which is run by Société des Artistes Français. In 1933, the City Museum of Birmingham, Alabama received a bust that Kane made of banker William Joseph Dangaix (1864-1943) who had formally lived in Birmingham, but had retired to Paris.

== Life in California ==
Around 1937, Kane had been taught to speak by a music teacher in Pasadena, California by Clara Henley Bussing. The Pasadena Post article also notes that Kane had the nickname "Peggy" which she often signed her letters with. From 1939, she was living around Hollywood, and soon there were legal disputes involving the administrators of her trust fund who moved to rein in what they felt was frivolous spending. These legal disputes had made the newspapers in 1940 and 1941 which referred to Kane as an oil heiress. She would then return to Rhode Island, where she had grown up.

== Return to Rhode Island 1942-1956 ==
In 1943, Kane had been elected to membership in the Providence Art Club. She converted a garage at her house in Narragansett, Rhode Island to become a studio, and this is where she created works like Narragansett's World War II memorial. In 1954, she'd create on her best known works, a bronze bust of President Dwight D. Eisenhower done in a classical style that she created from images that she saw of Eisenhower on television and Eisenhower personally received it in June 1954. The Eisenhower bust is in the White House. On November 25, 1956, Kane died at South County Hospital in Wakefield, Rhode Island.

== Legacy ==
Kane had given substantial bequests to the Providence Art Club, and to the St. Peter's-By-The-Sea Episcopal Church in the Central Street Historic District (Narragansett, Rhode Island), which had been her family's church. The Providence Art Club named their award after her for sculpture, the Florence Brevoort Kane Award which is given annually.

The Providence Art Club did an exhibition of her work in 2012. In 2017, a member of the Narrangansett Historical Society named Judy Landry organized a lecture on Kane's life and an art display.

Kane's grave is in her family's plot in Green-Wood Cemetery in Brooklyn, N.Y.
