= Bruno Beran =

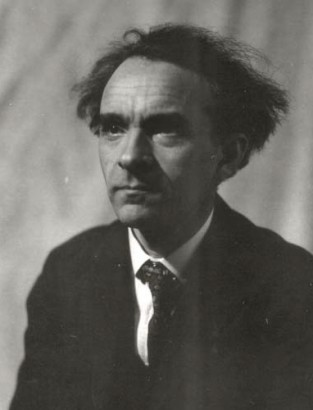
- Born: 6 January 1888; Brno, Austria-Hungary
- Died: 27 June 1979 (aged 91); Palma de Mallorca, Spain

Bruno Beran (6 January 1888 – 27 June 1979) was a Czech academic painter.

== Life ==
Beran was born on 6 January 1888 in Brno in the Jewish family of Lazar vulgo Alois Beran and his wife Bruna née Schwarz. He grew up with two older brothers, Philipp and Rudolf. In addition to his artistic talent, he also had a talent for music and was an exceptional violinist. In 1903–1905 he studied painting at the School of Arts and Crafts in Vienna under Carl Otto Czeschka and then the Academy of Fine Arts, where he trained under Rudolf Bacher. Here he met his future wife Irena, a student at the conservatory and also a native of Brno. He continued his studies at the Academy of Painting in Munich from 1907 to 1911 under Professors Johann Caspar Herterich and Heinrich von Zügel. In 1911 he studied in Paris at the Académie de la Grande-Chaumiere under Lucien Simon. In 1913, he visited Claude Monet in Giverny, a visit which influenced him artistically.

After the outbreak of the First World War he enlisted, but after a few months he was discharged from military service due to ill health and returned to his native Brno. From 1924 he was briefly a partner in the company "Brněnské továrny na soaplo Mira, s r. o.", but in June 1925 he left the company. Bruno Beran worked alternately in Paris, painting religious scenes in addition to portraits, and participated in exhibitions of the Brno "Association of German Artists of Moravia and Silesia".

In 1929, when the economic crisis ruined the family business, he went to Spain for the first time, where he spent three years of intensive artistic work in Ibiza. Even then he was already profiled as a sought-after portraitist and landscape painter, likened by some critics to Degas.

Beran married Irene Subak in Brno in 1935.

== Irene's art collection ==
Irene modelled for her husband's painting, and, financially independent, collected art. She was an early supporter of the avant-garde and especially the expressionist painter, Oskar Kokoschka, before it become fashionable. Artists who art she collected included Klimt, Kokoschka, Von Stȕck, Habermann, Corinth, Heine, Mayrhofer and Lotte Pritzel. The Würthle gallery produced a catalog with some of her collection of drawings.

== Nazi era ==
In 1936, after the outbreak of the Spanish Civil War, the Berans left for Great Britain and then returned to Paris. When Nazi Germany occupied Paris in 1940, the Berans fled across the Pyrenees to Portugal and from there to New York. The family home was confiscated. It is not clear what happened to the Beran art collection.

== Postwar ==
In New York Beran worked as an artist, In 1950, and received some commissions for portraits from the Washington diplomatic corps. He became an American citizen. He died on 27 June 1979 in Palma de Mallorca.

== Claims for restitution of Nazi-looted art ==
In 2007, a portrait of Irene by Hugo von Habermann that the Nazis had taken from Beran's brother Philip was restituted. Philip was murdered in the Holocaust

In 2022, a painting by Thomas Theodor Heine that the Nazis had looted was returned to the family by the Prussian Palaces and Gardens Foundation Berlin-Brandenburg ( Preußische Schlösser und Gärten Berlin-Brandenburg, SPSG).

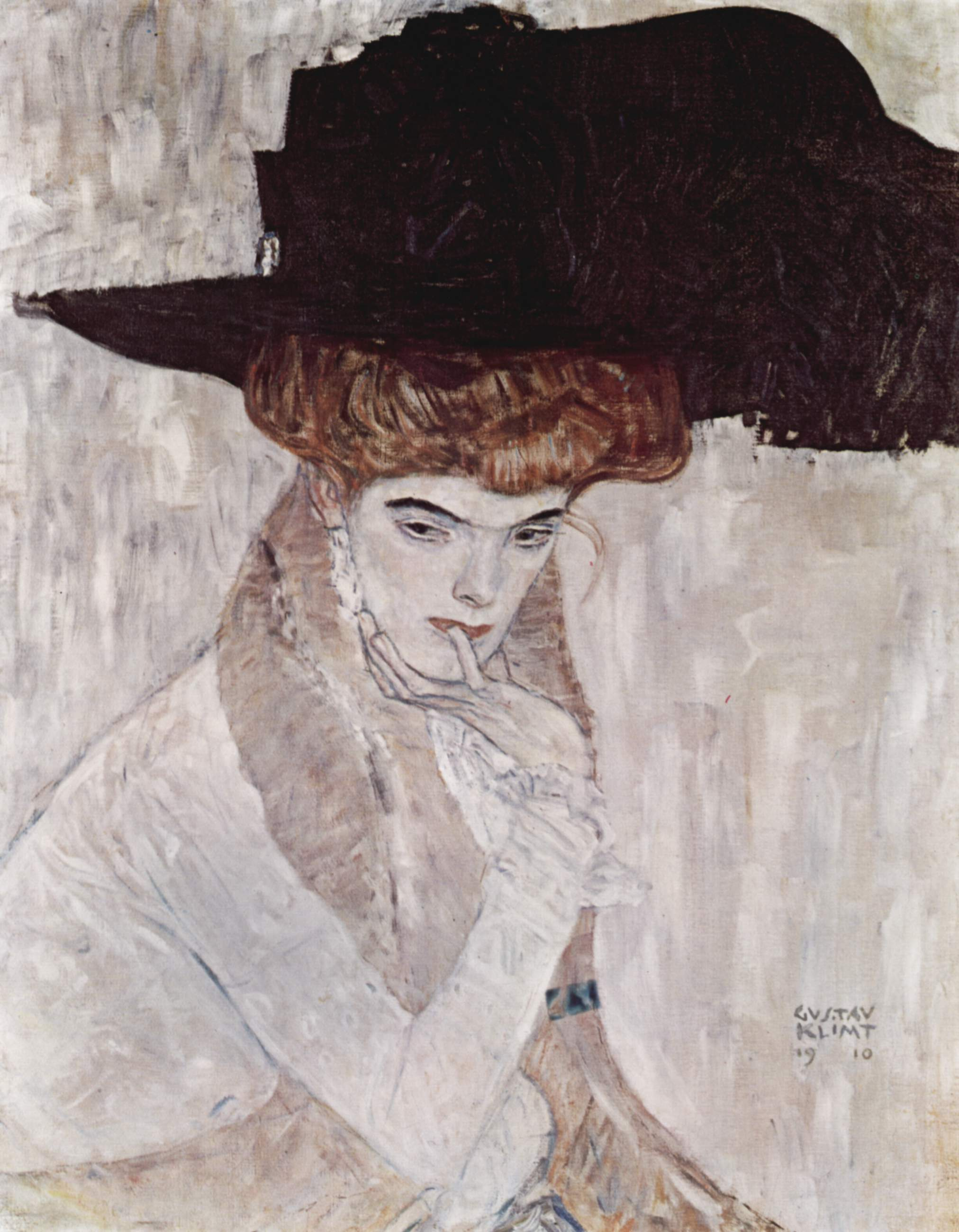
Gustav Klimt, The Black Feather Hat

In 2023 Ronald S. Lauder, the billionaire cosmetics heir and art collector, agreed to the restitution and repurchase of Gustav Klimt's, The Black Feather Hat, 1910 which had been in the collection of Irene Beran before the Nazis seized it. The painting resurfaced in an exhibit in Stuttgart organized in part by the Austrian Nazi Friedrich Welz.

== Representation in collections ==
- Regional Gallery Liberec
  - Dáma s psíkem, (1910–1928), olej plátno
- National Gallery Prague
  - two unspecified works
- Brno City Museum
  - Podobizna starce (1947), olej plátno
  - Oplakávání, olej plátno
  - Žena v maškarním kostýmu, olej plátno
  - Portrét malíře, olej plátno
  - Žena v orientálním kostýmu, olej plátno
  - Sedící ženský akt, olej plátno
  - Ukřižování, olej plátno
  - Na květinovém trhu, olej plátno
  - Dechová kapela, olej plátno
  - Žena v černém klobouku, olej plátno
  - Muž v šedém obleku, olej plátno
  - Žena v kožešinovém plášti, olej plátno
  - Muž v bílém plášti, olej plátno
  - Muž s rozcuchanými vlasy, (před 1930), olej plátno
  - Starý muž, olej plátno
  - Krajina se skálou a městem, (kol. 1930), křída barevná, papír

== Exhibitions ==
=== Collective ===
- 1920 – Bruno Beran, Gustav Böhm, Robert Farsky, Karl Korschann, Leonhard Schuller, Julius Schustala, Brno House of Art, Brno
- 1924 – Munchener Graphik / Bruno Beran, Brno House of Arts, Brno
- 1928 – Czechoslovak Fine Art 1918–1928, Brno (Brno-město), Brno
- 1930 – Weihnachtsausstellung / Bruno Beran, Brno House of Art, Brno
- 2000 – 90 years of the Brno House of Art, Brno House of Art, Brno
- 2011 – Moravian National Gallery: 194 years since its foundation, Vice-Governor's Palace, Brno
- 2012/2013 – Kunstschätze des Mäzens Heinrich von Liebig / Art Treasures of the Patron Heinrich von Liebig, Museum Giersch, Frankfurt
- 2013 – Young Lions in a Cage, Regional Gallery Liberec, Liberec
- 2014 – Young Lions in a Cage. Artistic groups of German-speaking artists from Bohemia, Moravia and Silesia in the interwar period, Gallery of Fine Arts in Cheb, Cheb

== Literature ==
- 1993 – Nový slovník československých výtvarných umělců (I. díl; A – K), Výtvarné centrum Chagall, Ostrava
- 2006 – Nová encyklopedie českého výtvarného umění (Dodatky), Academia, nakladatelství Akademie věd České republiky, Praha
