= Verner Åkerman =

Swedish sculptor

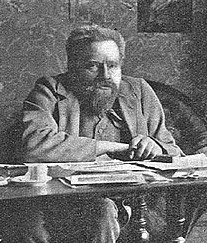
Verner Åkerman in his studio (c.1900)

Bror Morgan Verner Åkerman (1 January 1854, Gothenburg - 6 February 1903, Väversunda) was a Swedish sculptor; primarily of small figures.

== Biography ==
He was born to Rikard Åkerman, a ship's foreman, and his wife Hilda née Hellberg; growing up on their family farm. His childhood was difficult, however, as he had congenital kyphosis, a condition which would require the lifelong use of crutches. His initial studies were with the sculptor, Wilhelm Billqvist, at the Slöjdföreningens skola in Göteborg, from 1883 to 1887, he was a student of Carl August Söderman at the Royal Swedish Academy of Fine Arts in Stockholm. His tiny apartment became a popular gathering place for his fellow students, who enjoyed his singing.

In 1887, he was awarded the academy's Royal Medal for his plaster statue "Längtan" (Longing). The award was accompanied by a travel scholarship, which enabled him to go to Paris. He stayed there for almost ten years; maintaining a studio in a sort of barracks on the Avenue d’Orléans (now the Avenue du Général-Leclerc), where several other artists worked.

From 1890 to 1891, he made a combined study and pleasure trip to Florence, Rome and Naples. Not long after returning, in 1892, he married Jensina Lundquist, daughter of the decorative painter, Arvid Lundquist. They were married for only three months, when she died suddenly. Near the end of the 1890s, he went back to Stockholm, where he opened a studio on the Valhallavägen.

Among his larger public works may be mentioned a series of reliefs at the Royal Swedish Opera, and several portrait busts; including ones of the singer Arvid Ödmann, and the actress, Gerda Lundequist. After 1901, he was retained as a portrait sculptor by the Royal Academy, and was a regular participant in their exhibitions, although his final years were marred by failing health.

His long-time housekeeper, Amalia Pihlgren, was from Väversunda. After he accompanied her on a trip to visit her parents, he decided to build a home nearby. It was completed in 1902, but he had lived there for less than a year when he died, either of "heart paralysis" or pneumonia.

== Selected works ==
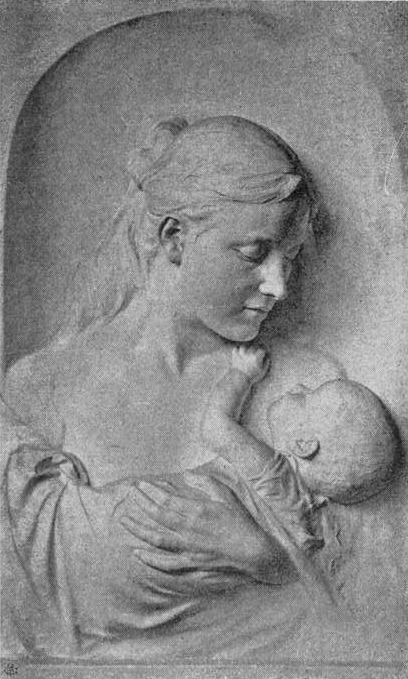
Madonna with Child

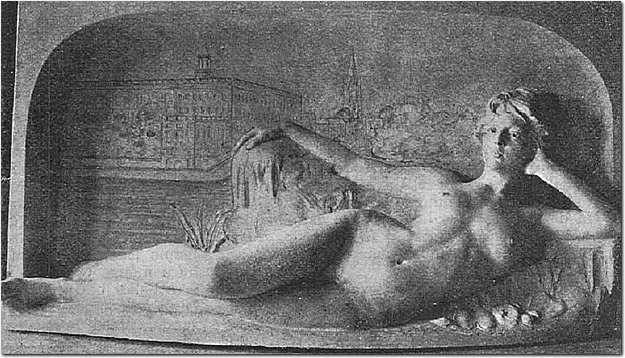
Mälardrottningen (The Queen of Mälaren), a nickname for Stockholm

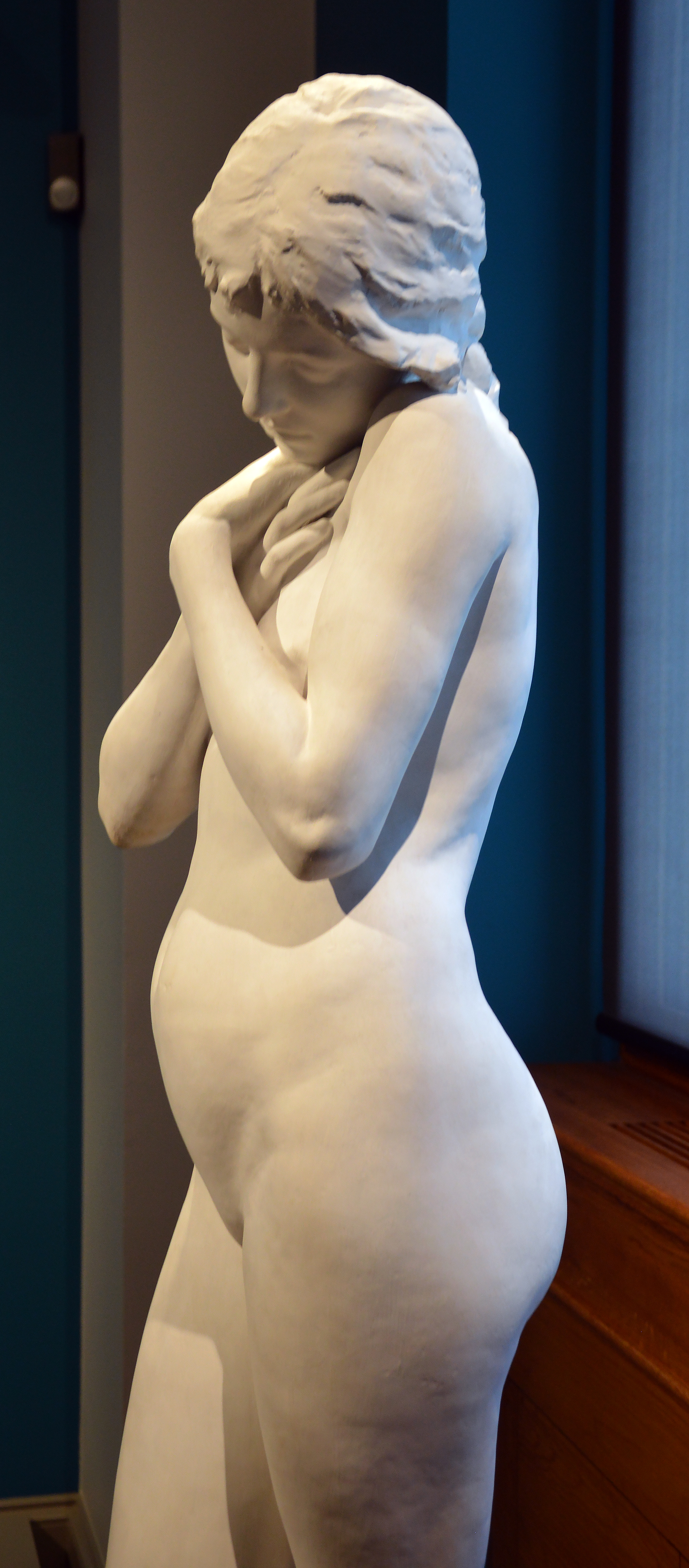
Spring Frost
