= Peignot =

Peignot may refer to:

== People ==
- Gabriel Peignot (1767–1849), French bibliographer
- Georges Peignot (1872–1915), typographer and director of the foundry G. Peignot et Fils
- Suzanne Peignot (1895–1993), French soprano
- Charles Peignot (1897–1983), founder of Arts et métiers graphiques review, co-founder of professional organisation ATypI, director of the foundry Deberny & Peignot
- Jo Peignot (1901–1969), French actor
- Colette Peignot (1903–1938), French author, also known as Laure
- Jérôme Peignot (1926–2025), French novelist, poet, pamphleteer, and expert in typography, son of Suzanne

== Industry ==
- Peignot (typeface), typeface designed by Cassandre
- Prix Charles Peignot, award in typeface design
- G. Peignot et Fils, French type foundry (1898–1919)
- Deberny & Peignot, French type foundry (1923–1972)
