= Eugène Chavant =

- Born: 12 February 1894; Grenoble, France
- Died: 28 January 1969 (aged 74); Grenoble, France
- Military career
- Allegiance: France
- Branch: French Army
- Commands: Departmental Committee for National Liberation
- Conflicts: First World War

Eugène Chavant was the founder of the French Resistance organisation France Combat in 1942 and a prominent member of the French Resistance. His nom de guerre was Clement, hence the "dit Clement" on the memorial to him in Grenoble. He was a member of the CDLN (Departmental Committee for National Liberation) for the département of Isère during the war. He was also a decorated war hero of the First World War.

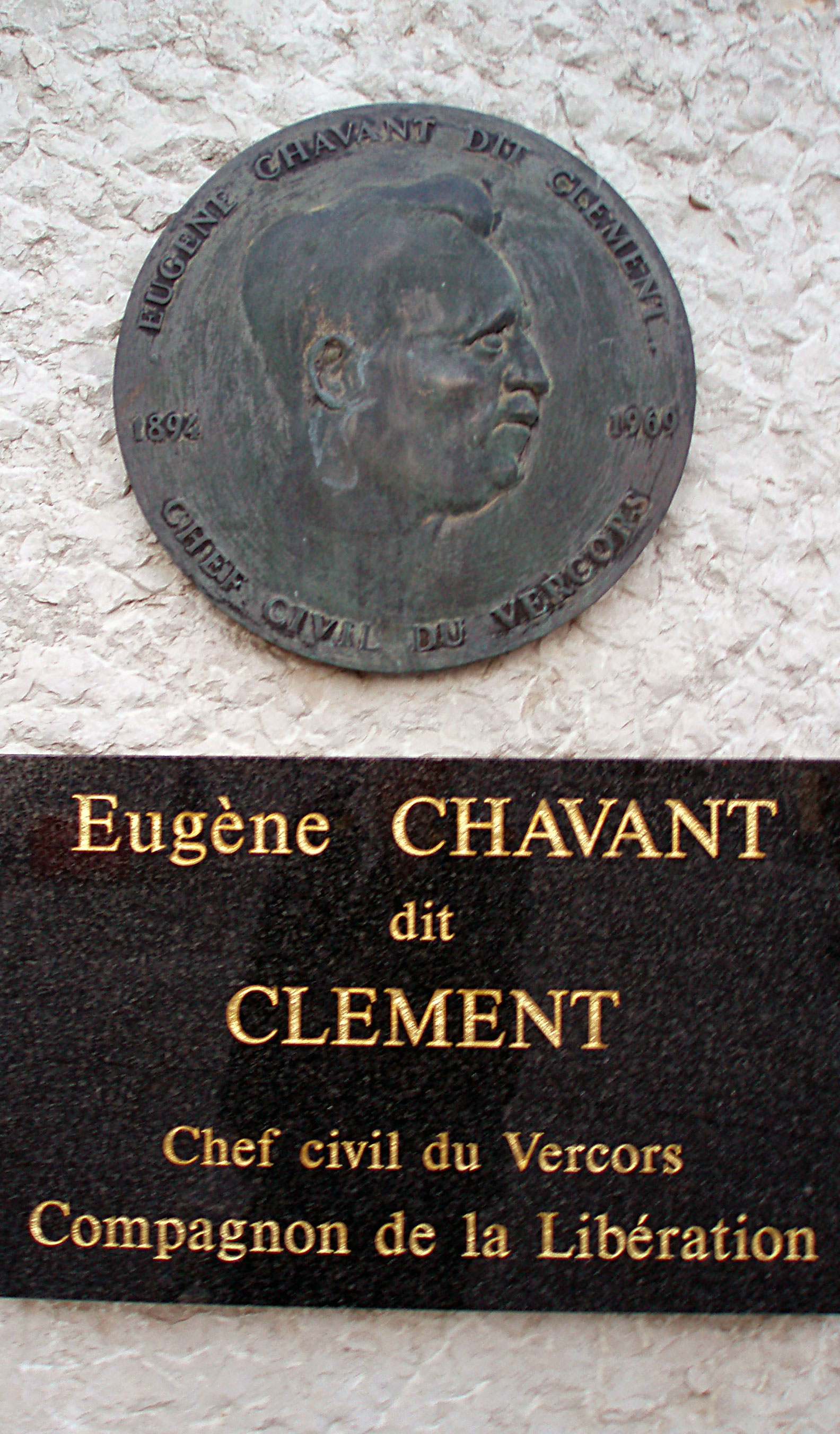
Memorial to Eugène Chavant in Grenoble

== Early life ==
Eugène Chavant was born on 12 February 1894 in Colombe, Isère, the son of a shoe-maker. He studied at the village school before becoming a mechanic in a factory, during which time he followed the distance-learning programme of the Ecole du Génie Civil which allowed him to become a master tradesman.

== World War 1 ==
In 1914, he was mobilised in the 11th Dragoons, then transferred to the 20th Battalion of Chasseurs where he was made a sergeant and platoon leader. Gassed near Soissons in 1918, he refused to leave the front. His attitude led him to receive the Médaille Militaire and the Croix de Guerre with four citations.

== Present-day ==
In Grenoble, he is commemorated by the tram-stop (lines A and C) Chavant.

== Honours ==
- Commandeur de la Légion d'Honneur
- Compagnon de la Libération
- Commandeur de l'Ordre National du Mérite
- Médaille Militaire
- Croix de Guerre 1914-1918 (4 citations)
- Croix de Guerre 1939–1945
- Médaille de la Résistance
