= MLCC =

MLCC may refer to:

== Organizations ==
- Manitoba Liquor Control Commission, a former Crown agency of the government of Manitoba, Canada
- Marx and Lenin Communist Circle, original name of the French political group Democratic Communist Circle
- Merrill Lynch Credit Corporation, a division of Merrill Lynch
- Michigan Liquor Control Commission, a Licensing and Regulatory Bureau of the US State of Michigan
- Monnaie Locale Complémentaire et Citoyenne, the French term for local currency

== Science and technology ==
- Micro lead-frame chip carrier, a type of package for integrated circuits
- Multi-layer ceramic capacitor, a type of surface-mount ceramic capacitor

== Other uses ==
- Mesoamerican Long Count calendar, a calendar used by pre-Columbian Mesoamerican cultures
