= Democratic Communist Circle =

Historical left-wing political group in France

- Abbreviation: CCD
- Founder: Boris Souvarine
- Founded: December 1, 1930
- Dissolved: 1934
- Preceded by: Marx and Lenin Communist Circle
- Newspaper: Bulletin Communiste; Critique Sociale
- Ideology: Marxism; Leninism; Anti-Stalinism
- Political position: Far-left

The Democratic Communist Circle (French: Cercle communiste démocratique, IPA: [sεʀkl kɔmynist demɔkʀatik], CCD) was a left-wing political group founded by Boris Souvarine in February 1926 under the original name of the Cercle communiste Marx et Lénine.

The group disbanded in 1934.

== Origins ==
The Democratic Communist Circle was formed as the re-branded version of a previous communist group called the Marx and Lenin Communist Circle (French: Cercle Communiste Marx et Lénine, CCML). The CCML was founded in 1926 to "keep alive Marxist revolutionary critical thought". On 1 December 1930, the CCML opted to change its name to the Cercle Communiste Démocratique (CCD) in order to "better differentiate itself from the many other communist groups active in French Marxist–Leninist revolutionary circles". The CCD's full origins, principles and organisational structure were published at length in the Bulletin Communiste No. 32–33 of July 1933.

== Political stance ==
Through its official journal, the Bulletin Communiste (until 1933), and then via the independently published la Critique Sociale, the CCD's influential members defended a Marxist critical analysis of politics and culture. Their most distinctive trait was a sharp criticism of Bolshevik state capitalism embodied in the Soviet Union from the mid 1920s onwards. In an attempt to demonstrate the inadequacy of Bolshevik state capitalism, the CCD published lengthy accounts of its writers' travels within the Soviet Union via the Bulletin Communiste. These accounts of daily-life in Soviet villages, towns, and cities painted a desolate and miserable picture of life in the Soviet Union during the 1920s. An account published in the Bulletin Communiste of 1930 on the "Soviet situation at the end of 1929" read:

It is a true terror. A terror that takes two forms. The first are the tribunals who condemn whole blocks of people to death. You would be charged with a supposed assassination attempt against some person of authority, or for some attempt to burn a kolkhoz and so two, three, four 'kulaks' were shot. In Kimry, a little town of koustari-cobblers, the administration wants to shut a church, and so a crowd offers passive opposition by regrouping en masse in front of the doors while shouting their disagreement – without the least bit of violence, but nevertheless, five are singled out by Soviet authorities and sentenced to death. In Abkhazia, for a reason everyone ignores, nine have been condemned to death. In Siberia, some 15 to 20 will be shot on Monday for offering some passive resistance to the kolkhoz, etc. The second terror were the officers of the GPU, who, we could almost say, shot peasants indiscriminately.

== Notable members ==
Amongst its members, the CCD counted Boris Souvarine and his partner Colette Peignot, the writers Raymond Queneau, Georges Bataille, the economist Lucien Laurat, and two future leaders of the French Resistance like Jean-Jacques Soudeille and Pierre Kaan; the philosopher Simone Weil was associated with the group and was invited to formally join but chose not to do so due to conflicts with Bataille.

== See also ==
- Democracy in Marxism
