= Marina Vega =

Spanish spy

- Born: 21 March 1923; Torrelavega, Cantabria, Spain
- Died: 11 June 2011 (aged 88); Madrid, Spain
- Other name: Marina Vega de la Iglesia
- Occupation: Spy
- Known for: Clandestine anti-Franco, anti-Nazi activities in Spain and France

Marina Vega de la Iglesia (Torrelavega, Cantabria, Spain, 21 March 1923 – Madrid, 11 June 2011) was a Spanish spy and an anti-Franco fighter during and after the Spanish Civil War (1936–1939) and, after the end of World War II, a Nazi hunter. She was the only woman in the Spanish network in the service of the French Resistance. She entered Charles de Gaulle's Free French Forces, at 17 years of age.

== Biography ==
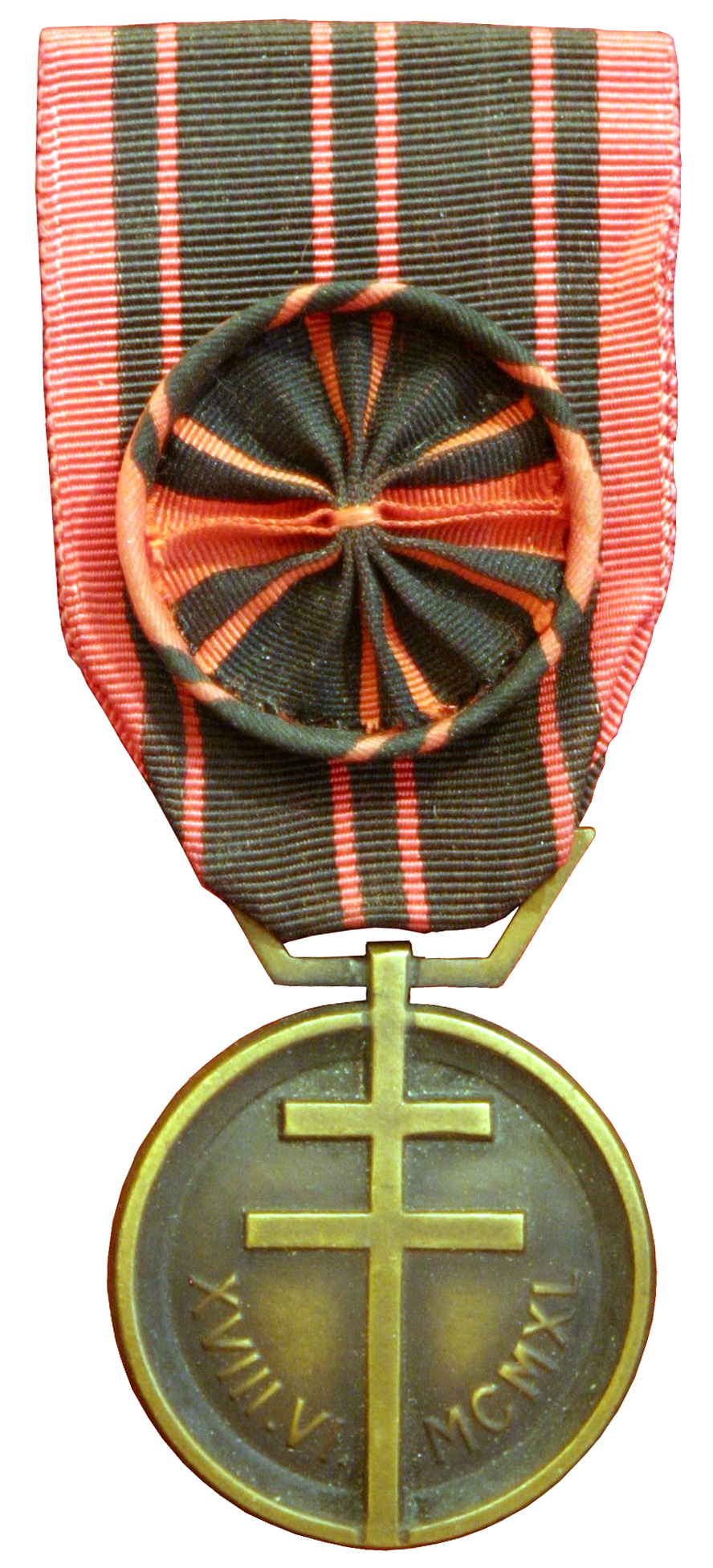
Sample Resistance Medal (France) awarded to Vega

Vega was born into a wealthy family of Republican, anti-fascist tradition. With the rise of Francisco Franco's forces and their victory in the Spanish Civil War, her father, director of prisons with the Republic, was sentenced to 16 years in jail for the "crime of Freemasonry" and sent to El Puerto de Santa María (Cádiz). Her mother, an employee of the Government of the Republic, had to go into hiding so as not to be targeted. Due to the situation in which her mother found herself, Marina was sent to France with some family friends for her own protection.

=== The French resistance ===
Vega was living in Paris when World War II broke out in 1939. The family that had welcomed her decided to flee to Mexico and invited her along, but Marina, even without hearing from her parents, made the decision to return to Spain instead. She made the trip while sitting on her suitcase in a crowded cattle car. Upon arriving in Madrid, she tracked down her family members who were in hiding.

Her status under the Franco regime caused her depression and she went to León with some family friends. There she met a young man who was related to the French diplomatic service. When Franco closed the Embassy of France, the French secret service was installed in the English embassy. Vega was introduced to them just when they were looking for a Spanish woman who was not registered and who could move freely around the country. Vega, 17 years old, was recruited.

She escorted refugees and brought documents and money, which she would strap onto her back.

Between 1942 and 1944, I made two trips a week to France. I don't know how many people I could have brought with me. I deduce that they were French Jews fleeing from the Nazis. Also some English.

The resistance support network in Spain ranged from tailors, who dressed border crossers, to document forgers. One day the group was discovered by the Spanish counterintelligence service Segunda Bis, so she had to flee to France. She continued to work with the Free French Forces until the conclusion of World War II.

=== Nazi-hunter ===
With the end of World War II, the search for Nazis began in France, Spain and the rest of Europe. Although Vega was demobilized, becoming a soldier without uniform, her job became the search for Nazi Germans and collaborators who had fled from France to Spain where they were welcomed by the fascist Franco regime. Vega's goal was to identify Nazis, have them captured, and "put them in the trunk and send them to France" where they would be tried in a court of law.

Vega settled permanently in Spain in 1950, when her clandestine services were officially terminated. On her own, she continued fighting against the Franco government saying, "I started distributing papers, organizing strikes. I was arrested and interrogated twice." When interviewed at 84 years of age, she still considered herself "a Freemason, a Republican, a red, and a lot of honor".

She was buried in Madrid.

=== Selected honours ===
- Decorated by the European Parliament for defending freedom.
- Medal of Resistance (France)
