= Yvonne Chollet =

French teacher and Resistance member

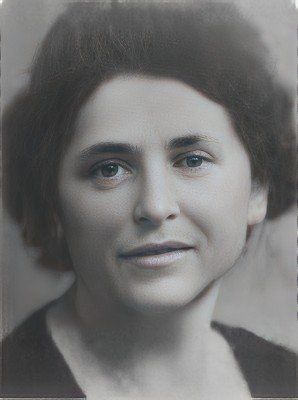
- This illustration has been enhanced by an AI (see original)
- Born: 1 March 1897; La Péruse, Charente, France
- Died: 23 February 1945 (aged 47); Ravensbrück Concentration Camp, Germany
- Occupations: Teacher and member of the French Resistance
- Children: Jean Chollet
- Parent(s): Marius Gay, Léonie Léonard
- Awards: Médaille militaire Croix de Guerre 1939–1945 (France); Médaille de la Résistance

Yvonne Chollet (1 March 1897 – 23 February 1945) was a teacher in Vendôme, France, who surveilled the movement of German equipment on behalf of the French Resistance and reported her findings to Allied forces during World War II. Arrested by the Gestapo in May 1943, she was imprisoned at Blois, Orléans, Romainville, and Compiègne before being deported to the Nazi concentration camp near the village of Ravensbrück (part of Fürstenberg/Havel) in northern Germany, where she died the following year.

Assigned prisoner number "27095" at the start of her imprisonment at the Ravensbrück concentration camp, her death there was recorded as occurring on 23 February 1945.

== Formative years ==
Born on 1 March 1897 in La Péruse, Charente, France, Yvonne Chollet was a daughter of Marius Gay, a teacher in the public schools of France, and Léonie Léonard, the founding president of the Human Rights League's 10th arrondissement section in Paris. Her parents ultimately separated.

Educated in her community's schools, she met and fell in love with a young man with the surname of Chollet. On a Thursday in June 1915 in Blois, France, he asked her to marry him. She was just 18 years old. But World War I interrupted their plans for a happy life.

Called up for military duty in 1917, her new fiancé completed his basic training Alençon and then in Romilly. Sergeant-Chef Chollet (first-sergeant Chollet) was then sent to the Black Sea, and was then assigned to an infantry regiment assigned to occupation duties in Lebanon. Although the Armistice was declared on 11 November 1918, he continued to serve in Lebanon until his unit was demobilized in 1920.

Yvonne Gay then married the former sergeant-chef, becoming Yvonne Chollet on 5 August 1920. Around this same time, she also received word that she had been awarded a teaching position at the French girls' high school in Beirut, Lebanon. In November 1920, she relocated to Beirut, where her husband was also able to secure a teaching position with the French boys' high school in Beirut.

In 1924, the Chollets returned home to France after accepting teaching positions in the schools of the Place St Denis in Vendôme. Yvonne Chollet reportedly used her "voix superbe" (superb singing voice) to inspire a love of music among her students throughout her teaching career, according to La Nouvelle République.

== World War II ==
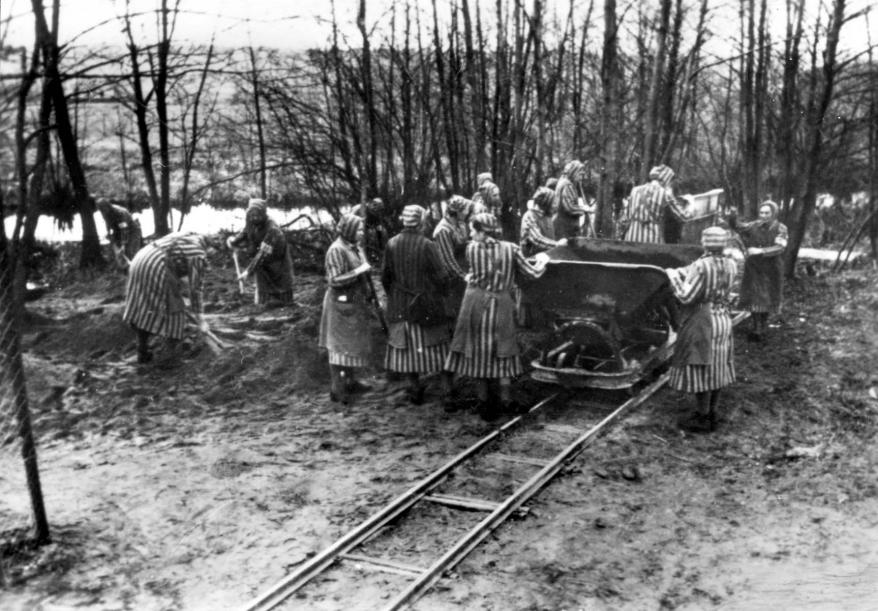
This 1939 photo illustrates the harsh treatment women received at Ravensbrück (Attribution: Bundesarchiv, Bild 183-1985-0417-15 / CC-BY-SA 3.0).

Yvonne Chollet became active politically during the early to mid-1930s as fascism began its rise across Europe. Without telling her family, she joined the French Resistance in 1936. Her son, Jean, was still a student at Ronsard High School, and she was still employed as a teacher at Saint-Denis, where she provided instruction to CM1 and CM2 students.

As her resistance work increased, so did the scrutiny that work received. By 1943, word of her activities had caught the attention of Nazi sympathizers in her community and within the government at Orléans. Publicly denounced by a "Mrs. R," according to historian Bernard Lefresne, Yvonne Chollet was arrested shortly thereafter by the Orléans Gestapo – in front of her class at Saint-Denis on 6 May that year. Charged with disseminating anti-German propaganda and performing clandestine acts, she was imprisoned at Blois that same day, and was subsequently transferred to the jails at Orléans and Romainville before being moved again to the internment camp at Compiègne. While there, she directed a choir which lifted her fellow prisoners' spirits, according to La Nouvelle République.

Deported from France on 30 January 1944, she was transported to the Ravensbrück concentration camp in Germany. Of the 18 barracks at the camp at the time of her arrival, 12 served as prisoners' housing, and were each equipped with three-tiered wooden bunks, a washroom and toilets. Inmates sentenced to punishment during their imprisonment were transferred from their respective housing units to a penal building; those who fell ill were sent to one of two barracks for the sick, something which occurred more frequently as food rations were cut and camp administrators assigned more and more women to the already overcrowded and increasingly unsanitary prisoner housing.

According to her son, Jean Chollet, she was sentenced to imprisonment there by Nazi officials for encouraging her civics students to write about Adolf Hitler's dishonesty, and also for her nighttime surveillance work, post-curfew, on behalf of the French Resistance, during which she reported to Allied authorities the number and type of German equipment being moved by area trains. Her assigned prisoner number at Ravensbrück was "27095".

== Death ==
Sung by Georges Thill, tenor of the Opera, and played by the band of the Garde Républicaine. Directed by Pierre Dupont

Despite the dismal conditions at Ravensbrück, Yvonne Chollet continued to employ her musical talents to inspire her fellow prisoners. On 22 February 1945 she reportedly sang Mehul's Le Chant du Départ ("Song of the Departure"). She died at Ravensbrück the next day.

She was survived by her son, Jean Chollet, who later went on to serve for a decade as president of L'Association des Amis de la Fondation pour la Mémoire de la Déportation (the Association of Friends of the Foundation for the Memory of the Deportation), helping to ensure that the fight against fascism by his mother and other French Resistance members would never be forgotten. He died in January 2015.

As for the woman who had set the wheels in motion for Yvonne's Chollet's deportation to and eventual death at Ravensbruck, "Mrs. R." was placed on trial for her role in denouncing Yvonne Chollet, whom Lefresne describes as a teacher who had become "a very popular woman" in her community. But, although Mrs. R. was convicted and "[s]entenced to 20 years of forced labor," her sentence was commuted to one of "seclusion" several years later as public anger diminished toward those who had been labeled as collaborators.

== Honors ==
Yvonne Chollet was honored with multiple awards for her valor and suffering as a member of the French Resistance and victim of the Nazi concentration camp system. The most weighty of these included the:

- Médaille militaire,
- Croix de Guerre 1939-1945, and
- Médaille de la Résistance

Je résiste, tu résistes, elle existe ("I resist, you resist, it exists"), an award-winning, 35-minute short film about the life of Yvonne Chollet made by students of the Lycée Ampère (Ampère high school) in Loir-et-Cher, was broadcast by Vendôme's Office of Tourism in 2017 as part of the community's annual commemoration of France's National Day of Resistance.

"She was a good woman, the Occupation made her an exceptional woman," observed historian Jean-Claude Pasquier when discussing Yvonne Chollet during his November 2013 presentation regarding the history of the Yvonne Chollet school and Vendôme's Saint-Denis school system. A plaque installed at the school which bears her name also pays homage to her bravery as does a booklet from the Vendôme Office of Tourism, which allows visitors to learn about the lives of the men and women involved in the French Resistance. The booklet describes her as "[d']une force de caractère exemplaire, toujours égale à elle-même" ("[a]n exemplary force of character, always equal to herself").
