= Colette Peignot =

French writer and poet

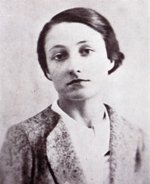
Colette Peignot

Colette Peignot (French: [kɔlɛt pɛɲo]; October 8, 1903 – November 7, 1938) was a French writer and poet. She is most known by the pseudonym Laure, but also wrote under the self-chosen name Claude Araxe, derived from a phase in Virgil's Aeneid.

== Life ==
Peignot was born in Paris into an old bourgeois family of intellectuals; her mother's side included such academics as Albert Lenoir, Alexandre Lenoir and her father Georges Peignot a famous French type designer responsible for the creation of several renowned typefaces such as Grasset, Auriol, and Garamond working for the company G. Peignot et Fils.

Her childhood was very tragic; at 13 she lost her father and three uncles in the First World War. Then, at the same age, she contracted tuberculosis through contact with her uncle Lucien and her young cousin (neither of whom survived) and almost died from it. Finally, she suffered repeated and violent abuse from a catholic clergyman which her mother ignored.

She was a student at Cours Desir and short-lived student of Marguerite Long but she soon entered into rebellion against her family and her environment by leading the life of a free woman. In 1925, she met the anarchist journalist Jean Bernier, a friend of Drieu and the surrealists, eight years her senior. Their relationship was a tumultuous one, Ella Maillart, a friend of Colette Peignot, reported that on their first evening Colette said, “I want to drink your blood from your mouth”. The ill-matched couple did not last and their relationship fell apart due to trials of absence, episodes of illness, and Jean’s affair with an ailing woman whom he pitied. She left for Corsica, then travelled to the south of France, before returning to Paris. At this time, she had discovered that she was pregnant. This discovery coincided with an attack of tuberculosis. Exhausted, on January 9, 1927, Colette Peignot shot herself in the chest but survived.

In 1928, during or after a stay at the Leysin sanatorium, she met Eduard Trautner, a doctor, poet and writer close to communist circles, and a friend of Brecht. She left to live for six months in Berlin (at no. ^{129} of the Hohenzollerndamm) in total seclusion and submission: a fine scholar, Trautner is a lover of Sade and Sacher-Masoch, and his fantasies resonate with the nihilism of his prey. She escapes, concluding: “One night I ran away. It was too much, too perfect in the genre”.

In 1930, she took advantage of her Russian language courses taken at Oriental Languages and, in an idealistic impulse, left for the Soviet Union to share the life of moujiks in a kolkhoz. On the way, she met writers, Victor Serge and Boris Pilniak (whose mistress she became). She stayed in Leningrad, Sochi and Moscow. But, penniless and ill, she had to return to France.

She then led a dissolute life in Paris, rue Blomet, giving herself without pleasure to passing men, according to G. Bataille. There she met Boris Souvarine, one of the founders of the French Communist Party, (nicknamed "Léon Bourénine" in the Écrits de Laure) with whom she maintained a peaceful but sad relationship. In his wake, she joined and actively participated in the meetings of the Democratic Communist Circle, where she met the philosopher Simone Weil with whom she formed a deep friendship, as well as Michel Leiris, Georges Bataille, Raymond Queneau, Pierre Kaan, and Karl Korsch.

Once she finally received her father's inheritance, she abundantly subsidized the Cercle's review, La Critique sociale, and also wrote several articles there (thirteen under the pen name "Claude Araxe", two under the initials alone of “CP”, i.e. seven reviews of works originally published in Russian and eight articles on Soviet politics or culture). The name "Araxes" is the name of a river in Azerbaijan, mentioned by Virgil in the Aeneid, "torrential, which could not bear the imposition of a bridge to cross it", according to Souvarine.

In 1933 and 1934, she also wrote six articles for Le Travailleur Communiste Syndicale et Coopératif ( Paul Rassinier's weekly), part of the Independent Communist Federation of the East, founded in November 1932 by a group of oppositional communists from Doubs, with the support of the Cercle de Souvarine.

In 1934, she left Boris Souvarine for Georges Bataille. Victim of an “alleged attack of dementia”, she was hospitalized in the clinic of Doctor Weil, father of Simone Weil, and then followed by Doctor Adrien Borel, psychiatrist and friend of Bataille. During the summer of 1935, she moved in with Georges Bataille. Their “intense” relationship turned out to be chaotic, riven by alcoholism, public humiliations, and a tour of brothels, though simultaneously worldly and cultured, steeped in the company of Michel Leiris, André Masson, Roger Caillois, Pierre Klossowski and Denise Rollin. She also found herself at the center of Bataille's secret society Acephale, which was known for its secretive meetings in the woods and pretensions towards human sacrifice (themselves never realized). It was at this moment that she chose her new pen name, Laure, one of her first names (Colette Laure Lucienne Peignot), but also in reference to Laure de Sade, Petrarch's muse and grandmother.

Colette Peignot ended her life in complete poverty and medicated to the extreme. She died from tuberculosis in 1938, at the age of thirty-five in a room rented by Georges Bataille in Saint-Germain-en-Laye. Shortly before dying, she wrote to Bataille: "I hated our life, often I wanted to save myself, to go alone into the mountains (it was saving my life now I know)."

She is buried in the cemetery of Fourqueux, then Seine-et-Oise, in a grave difficult to identify, topped with a boxwood cut in the shape of an “L”. Just before closing the coffin, Michel Leiris slipped five dice into it, “concretions of destiny that we hold in the hand”; for his part, Georges Bataille threw a few pages of The Marriage of Heaven and Hell by William Blake onto the remains. A few years later, he evoked with emotion the painful agony of Laure, in numerous fragments found from his essay Le Guilty (1944), writing in particular: “I have just told my life story: death had taken the name of LAURE”.

Colette Peignot suffered throughout her life from fragile health, fever attacks, coughs until she lost consciousness, nervous attacks, suicidal impulses, abortions, etc. She wandered from sanatoriums to rest homes, a medical nomad at a time when tuberculosis was treated through inactivity: Vernet-les-Bains in 1919, Barèges, Lourdes and Lavernoze in 1923, Banyuls in 1926, Bois-Cerf, Céret, Prats-de-Mollo, and Laccabanasse in 1927, Leysin in 1928, Combloux in 1930, etc.

== Legacy ==
Peignot's works were published posthumously by Leiris, against the will of her brother, Charles Peignot. They were therefore published under the name "Laure". Her nephew, the poet Jérôme Peignot (who thought of Colette as a “diagonal mother”), republished the manuscripts in 1971 and 1977, despite the same family's opposition.

== Works ==
Colette Peignot published nothing during her lifetime, apart from her political or journalistic writings. Her literary fame is posthumous and is due to the publication in 1939 and 1943 of a series of manuscripts under the name of Le Sacré and Histoire d'une petite fille despite the violent opposition of her brother Charles ("I challenge you to claim that you have any intellectual or moral right to [these manuscripts]”).

- 1939: The Sacred. Followed by poems and various writings, Non-commercial edition, edition of 200 copies, including 40 on Arches laid paper; all copies are nominative and bear the words “No copies will be given other than for personal use”.
- 1943: Story of a little girl, Paris, 55 pages. Non-commercial edition, edition of 40 copies, including 5 on old paper.
- 1971: Écrits de Laure, Paris, Jean-Jacques Pauvert (preceded by “Ma Mère diagonale” by Jérôme Peignot and “Life of Laure” by Georges Bataille)
- 1976: Laura. Writings, unpublished fragments, Éditions Change-Errant, 317 p.
- 1977: Writings of Laure. Writings, fragments, letters. Paris, Jean-Jacques Pauvert (translation in Italy, Germany, the United States, Japan). Reissues in 1985 and 2005.
- 1978: Writings. Fragments, letters. Paris, General Union of Editions, collection 10/18
- 1987: Found writings, preface by Jérôme Peignot, Mont-de-Marsan, Les Cahiers des Brisants
- 1999: A breakup. 1934 (correspondence with Boris Souvarine, his family, Georges Bataille, Pierre and Jenny Pascal, and Simone Weil), text established by Jérôme Peignot and Anne Roche, Paris, Éditions des Cendres, 192 p.
- 2014: Les Cris de Laure, unpublished fragments, poems and correspondence, edition established by Rebecca Ferreboeuf and Jean-Sébastien Gallaire, Meurcourt, Éditions les Cahiers, 2014.
- 2015: The Sad Privilege or a Fairy Tale Life, Paris, Allia, 64 p. ISBN 978-2-84485-871-9
- 2019: Complete writings, edition presented, established and annotated by Marianne Berissi and Anne Roche, afterword by Jérôme Peignot ("My mother diagonal", 1970), abundant notebook of photographs, bibliography, index, Meurcourt, Éditions les Cahiers, 2019, 958 p.
