= Joseph Dubar =

- Nicknames: Jean de Roubaix; Jean du Nord; Jean de Liège; Jean Ballois; Simon; Robert
- Born: 30 December 1899; Roubaix, France
- Died: 3 November 1960 (aged 60) Roubaix, France
- Rank: Lieutenant-Colonel (Forces Françaises Combattantes); Major A.R.A. (Belgian Army)
- Known for: French resistance leader
- Awards: Legion of Honor; War Cross 1939–1945; Resistance Medal; Cross of the Resistance Volunteer Combatant; French 39-45 commemorative medal; Order of the Crown; Croix de guerre; Medal of the Armed Resistance 1940–1945; Distinguished Service Order; Presidential Medal of Freedom
- Spouses: Laure Hennion (m. 1924, d. 1945); Renée Lodewyck (m. 1948)
- Children: Jean Dubar (one son from second marriage)
- Other work: textile worker, cabinetmaker, knitwear workshop owner

Joseph Dubar (30 December 1899 – 3 November 1960) was a prominent figure in the French resistance during World War II. Operating under various aliases such as "Jean du Nord" or "Jean de Roubaix", he founded and led the Ali-France resistance network, playing a crucial role in the evasion of Allied soldiers, the transmission of secret mail, and intelligence gathering. His merits were recognized after the war with high military ranks and numerous decorations from Allied countries.

== Life ==
Joseph Dubar was born into a modest family on 30 December 1899 in the industrial city of Roubaix, located in the Nord department of France. He displayed a talent for drawing and at the age of thirteen started to work in textile manufacturing, a then major industry in Roubaix. In his spare time, he attended the École des Beaux-Arts in Lille, before becoming a cabinetmaker and setting up his own business. His career was interrupted by the outbreak of World War I in 1914.

As a teenager, Dubar opposed the German occupation in World War I. He sabotaged German communication lines by injecting acid into a telephone relay. Having a particular interest in chemistry and electricity and having studied these subjects, by the age of 15 he was able to manufacture his own explosives. Using potash, he committed his first sabotage by blowing up a pylon that supported all the telephone lines of a German headquarters in the Parc Barbieux in Roubaix. In 1915, he was arrested by German troops at the age of sixteen and interned in a camp in the Ardennes until the end of the war.

In 1924, Dubar married Laure Hennion, niece of the Socialist mayor of Roubaix Jean-Baptiste Lebas. After the harsh Depression of the 1930s, he opened with his wife, who specialized in hosiery, a small workshop around 1937/38, which operated until he was drafted in early 1940. He became an activist in the French Section of the Workers' International (SFIO). His familial and pre-war political connections served as the bedrock for trust and cooperation in the formation and operation of his future resistance groups.

Following the death of his first wife in 1945, Dubar remarried in 1948 to Renée Lodewyck, with whom he had a son, named Jean.

Joseph Dubar passed away from cancer on 3 November 1960, in Roubaix. A street in Roubaix was later named in his honor.

== Resistance ==
In the aftermath of the Fall of France in 1940, a diverse array of French resistance groups emerged, comprising individuals who were united in their opposition to the Nazi occupation and the collaborationist Vichy regime. These resistant fighters hailed from various social strata and held diverse political affiliations. Early acts of defiance included sabotage, intelligence gathering, and the establishment of clandestine networks to transmit information on the occupying forces to London or to assist British and Belgian soldiers back to the free world. Some 2,000 prisoners of war were being cared for in hospitals in Belgium and northern France, and a further 2,000 were roaming the roads. Since the fall of 1940, Marseille had been home to a branch of MI9 and many escapees took refuge in the British Seaman's Mission headed by Donald Caskie.

Very little is known about Dubar's activities in 1940. In January 1940, he was mobilized into the 3rd Engineering Regiment in Arras and participated in the destruction of bridges near Croix, Wasquehal and Roubaix in May–June 1940. On 28 May 1940, his unit was encircled in Lille. However, Dubar refused to surrender and managed to escape and return to his home in Roubaix. Immediately following his return, in June 1940, Dubar entered into clandestine resistance. His initial actions in the Resistance involved assisting British, Belgian and French soldiers who were stranded, isolated, or had escaped from Belgium and Dunkirk. Dubar provided them with shelter, food, and clothing.

It soon became clear in northern France that there were opportunities to evacuate them back to Britain from Fort-Saint-Jean near Marseilles. He was put in touch with Cécile Hermey, a teacher in Roubaix who had accompanied two English soldiers to Marseille during Christmas 1940 and put them in contact with the Pat O'Leary Line and Donald Caskie. Back in Roubaix, Cécile Hermey immediately passed on the information to Dubar, who would use this escape route until July 1941.

Helped by a group of trusted individuals around him, including his wife, Laure Hennion, his uncle Jean-Baptiste Lebas, his cousin Raymond Lebas, Pierre Joly and others, he started to organize an escape route towards unoccupied Marseille. This resistance network became known by its password "CAVIAR". The region Lille–Roubaix–Tourcoing became a hub for Franco-Belgian resistance.

In early 1941, Jules Correntin brought him into contact with the Belgian network "Zero". Nearly 3,000 Frenchmen, grouped around him and his Belgian comrades, would set up escape and intelligence networks, mail lines, operations centres for parachuting, the aerial removal of mail and the clandestine landing of the Lysander-type "Lizzies". These Frenchmen had chosen to serve in Belgian formations, which without them could not have operated in French territory and were indispensable to relations with Great Britain. Together with Paul Joly, nicknamed "Caviar", Joseph Dubar arranged also the evacuation of Belgian aviators eager to join their comrades in the Royal Air Force squadrons. Under the name of "Jean du Nord", he personally ensured the evacuation to Marseille of most of the aviators of the Belgian Military Aeronautics who escaped from Belgium to reach Great Britain. From July 1940 to July 1941, he was personally responsible for the evacuation of around a hundred British soldiers, including a brigadier general.

In July 1941, at the request of Captain Pierre Vandermies, a resistance network was officially set up, initially taking the name "Caviar" then that of Ali-France, and was placed directly under the orders of the Belgian services in London. Dubar was responsible for receiving the so-called "Jean de la Lune" (John of the Moon), the Belgian agents and their equipment parachuted into France. By July 1943, he had flown 21 such missions, picking up a large majority of the Belgians parachuted into France without accident with the help of his associates. With his Belgian comrades, network leaders in France and under the command of "Walter", he participated in the evacuation of escaped death row inmates, undercover agents and Belgian political figures. In 1942, he helped to create a Delbo network in Paris and, in July 1942, to create the Zéro-France network in Roubaix.

From the very beginning, the German police hunted Dubar under the name "Jean de Roubaix". On 21 May 1941, his wife, her uncle Lebas and his cousin were arrested. His wife Laure Dubar, also a socialist and resistance activist, died in deportation to Bergen-Belsen on 10 April 1945.

In 1943, he was responsible for locating and photographing the launch pad and V2 rocket depots, and thanks to René Fonson, he obtained accurate data and photos that would allow the destruction of the V-2 launching blockhaus in the Eperlecques forest in August 1943. At the request of London, following the arrest of Joly in July 1943, Dubar joined the British capital in December 1943.

On 8 May 1944, he parachuted again with radio operator René Bruaux. The two men's mission was to evacuate mail by air, receive containers and parachuted agents. They ensured liaison with the Belgian Courier Command Post (PCC) for all Belgian organisations in France as well as for Zéro-France. Joseph Dubar ceased his resistance activities during the summer of 1944. He ended the war with the rank of lieutenant-colonel in the French Combatant Forces, while Belgium promoted him to the rank of Major as an Agent de Renseignement et d'Action (ARA).

For the entire duration of the war, official records estimate the number of men, military or civilian, French, Belgian and British, transported to the free zone or Spain by Joseph Dubar at around seven hundred.

== Decorations ==
His merits were recognized after the war with high military ranks and numerous decorations from Allied countries. Dubar received the following decorations:

- Officer of the Legion of Honor
- War Cross 1939–1945
- Resistance Medal
- Cross of the Resistance Volunteer Combatant
- French 39-45 commemorative medal with lightning bolt
- Commander of the Order of the Crown with palm presented by the Prince Regent Charles (Belgium)
- Croix de guerre (Belgium)
- Medal of the Armed Resistance 1940–1945 (Belgium)
- Distinguished Service Order presented by King George VI (Great Britain)
- Presidential Medal of Freedom with palm (United States)

== See also ==
- Escape and evasion lines (World War II)
