= Janie McCarthy =

Irish resistance worker in WWII

- Born: 19th January 1885. Bohereengowan, New Street, Killarney, County Kerry
- Died: 20 December 1964 (aged 78–79); Hertfordshire British Hospital, Paris

Janie McCarthy (1885 – 20 December 1964) was an Irish resistance worker during World War II in Paris, and a language teacher.

== Early life and education ==
Janie (sometimes recorded as Jane) McCarthy was born in Bohereengowan, Main Street, Killarney, County Kerry. She was fourth of eight children (six girls and two boys) of shopkeeper Michael McCarthy, and Margaret (nee Kelleher). She was most likely educated locally, emigrating to France in 1910. Initially, she lived in Brittany working as an au pair, before moving to Paris. She attended the Sorbonne, studying French and English. McCarthy started a language school which developed a huge reputation with the children of royalty and European aristocracy attending. For her work in teaching during World War I, she was awarded the Ordre des Palmes académiques in 1918, which was rarely awarded to foreigners.

== Work in the French Resistance ==
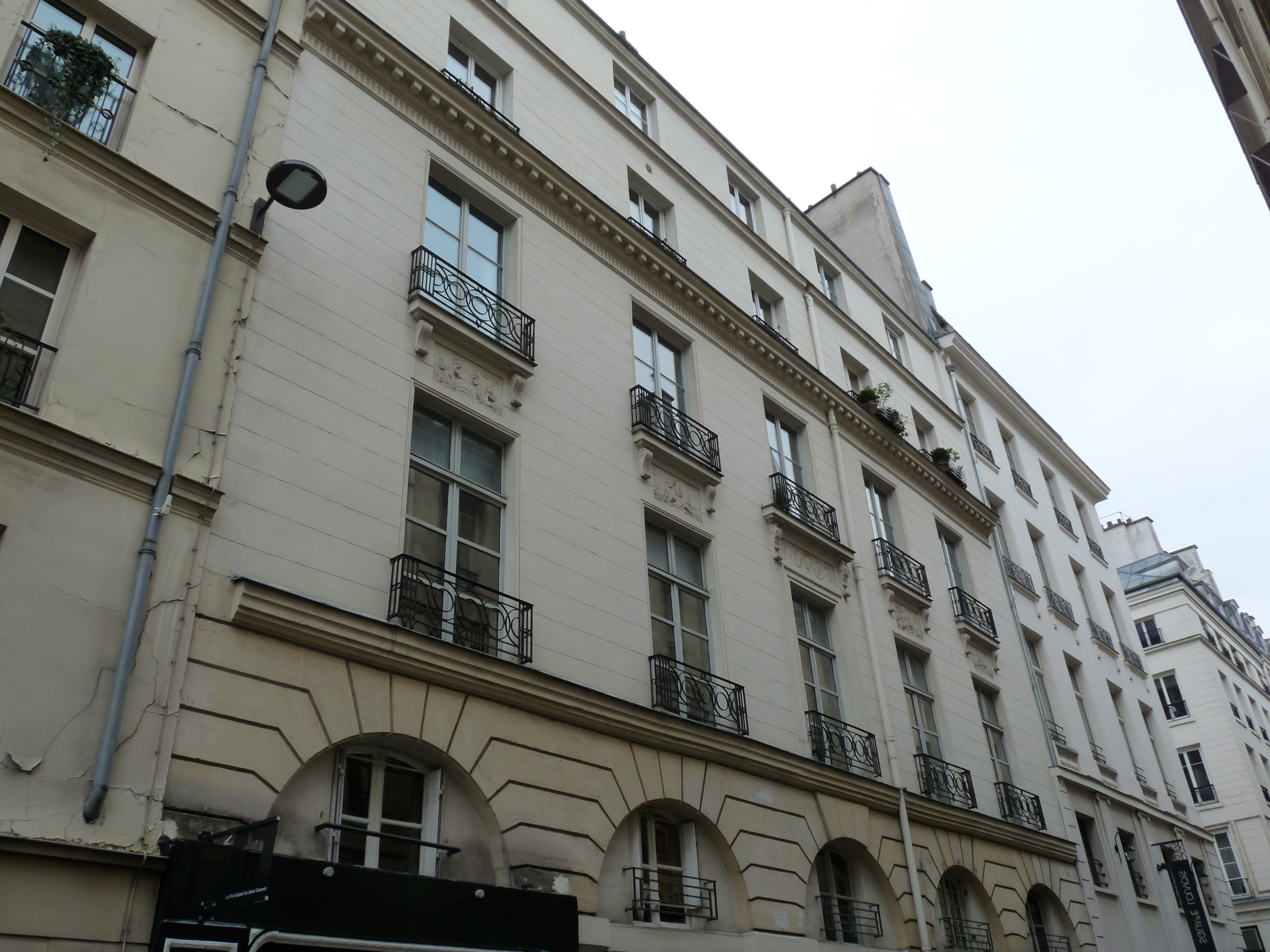
McCarthy's home in Paris at 64, rue Sainte-Anne.

At the outbreak of World War II, McCarthy destroyed her British passport to avoid the possibility of being imprisoned by German authorities. She joined the resistance and other related groups when France fell, she even started her own initiative in the Paris area. Her area of specialisation was in rescue work, saving a number of lives including members of the allied intelligence services and armies. Her method was simple, enrolling each refugee as a member of staff. Her riskiest gambit was bringing an American officer through a Gestapo inspection in the Paris metro, convincing the officers that he was as a deaf mute because he could not speak French. From 1940 to 1944, she only lost one refugee, a French double agent. She was also involved in intelligence gathering. While many of her counterparts were sent to concentration camps, McCarthy evaded detection for the entirety of the war. Her home at 64, rue Sainte-Anne acted as a safe house. Within the Service historique de la Défense, McCarthy was recorded as a man. She donated a large portion of her salary to fund a civilian camp at Saint Denis, the Military Hospital Val de Grace and the sanatorium at Brevannes.

For her work she was awarded the French Croix de Guerre and Médaille de la Résistance, the American medal of freedom and a citation signed by President Eisenhower, and the British Tedder certificate for aiding British personnel to escape.

== Later life and death ==
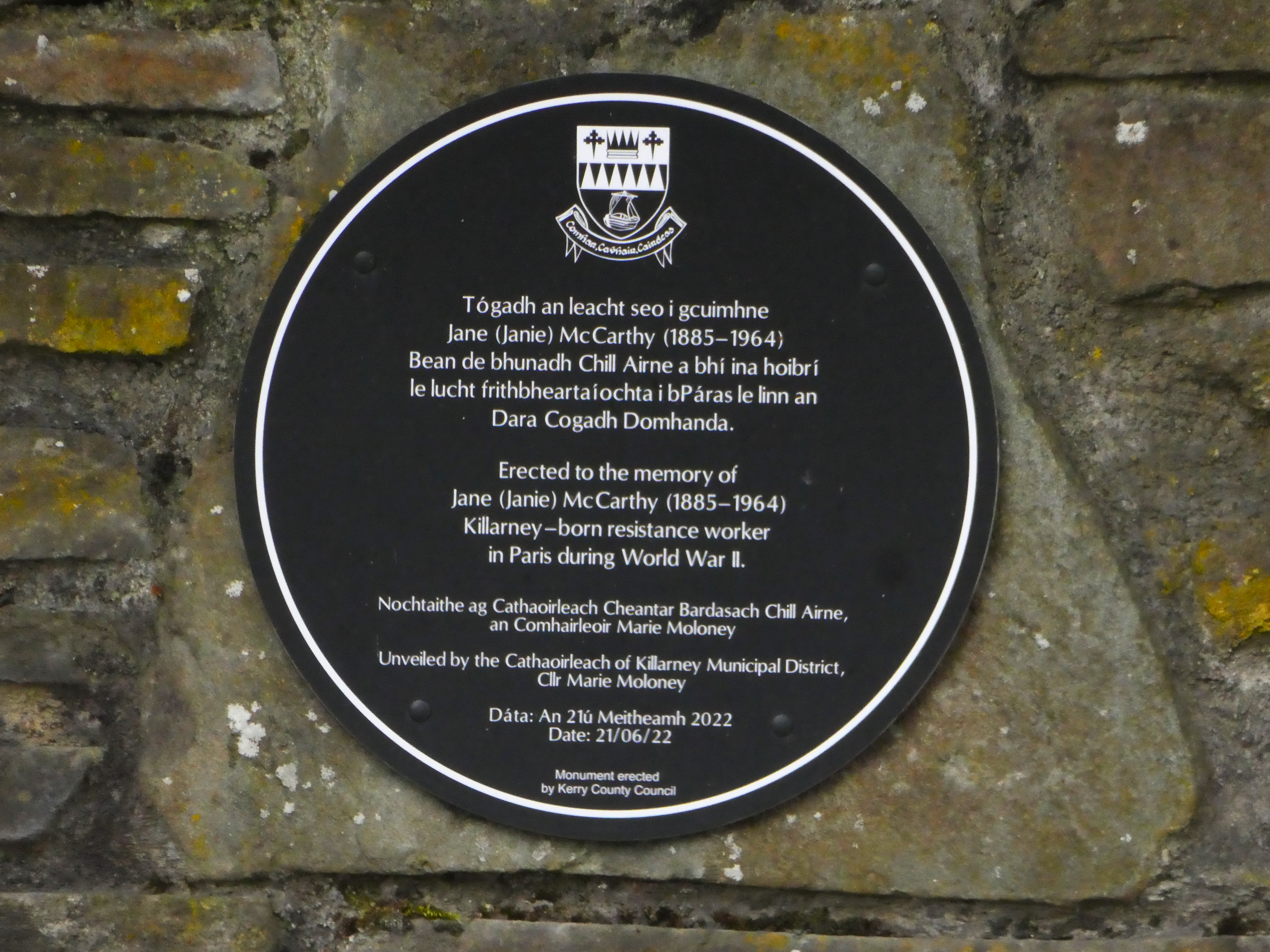
Plaque dedicated to McCarthy erected in Killarney in 2022.

McCarthy continued to teach her pupils after the war, bringing students to Kerry on summer trips. She even conducted language classes at her bedside in June 1964, as her health was failing. She was brought to the Hertfordshire British Hospital, Paris in November 1964, dying there on 20 December 1964. She was buried in Paris on 28 December. Her death was not noted in the Irish national newspapers, bar the Irish Times.
