= Médaille militaire =

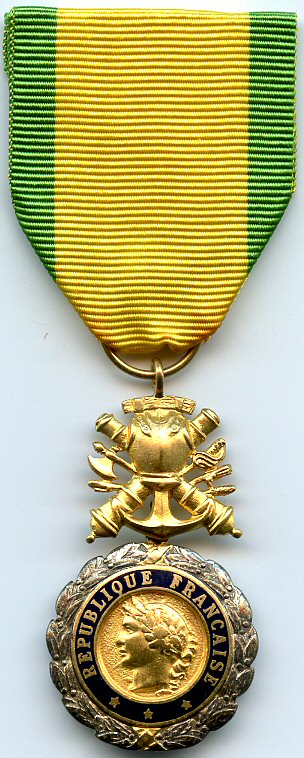
- Badge of the Médaille militaire (obverse)
- Type: Military decoration
- Awarded for: Valour in combat or long service
- Presented by: France
- Eligibility: Privates, NCOs, Commanders-in-chief generals and admirals
- Status: Currently awarded
- Established: 22 January 1852
- Ribbon of the Military Medal

Precedence
- Next (higher): Order of Liberation
- Next (lower): National Order of Merit

The Médaille militaire (French pronunciation: [medaj militɛʁ], "Military Medal") is a military decoration of the French Republic for other ranks for meritorious service and acts of bravery in action against an enemy force. It is the third highest award of the French Republic, after the Legion of Honour, a civil and military order, and the Order of Liberation, a Second World War-only order. The Médaille militaire is therefore the most senior entirely military active French decoration.

During World War I, 230,000 médailles were awarded, when 1,400,000 French Army soldiers were killed and 3,000,000 wounded. For comparison, the UK Military Medal was awarded on 115,000 occasions in World War I, when 673,375 British Army soldiers were killed and 1,643,469 wounded. There were 628 awards to 627 recipients of the Victoria Cross, the United Kingdom's highest military decoration.

The award was first established in 1852 by the first President of the French Republic, Louis-Napoléon Bonaparte who may have taken his inspiration from a medal established and awarded by his father, Louis Bonaparte, King of Holland.

After the First World War, the Military Medal was also temporarily awarded for wounds received in combat.

== Statute ==
Like many other French awards, the médaille can be awarded for different reasons. It can be awarded to foreign nationals serving with or alongside the French armed forces.

- To members of the military other than commissioned officers (including enlisted ranks, non-commissioned officers and aspirants or Officer Designate).
  - As an award for valour, it is the second highest award ranking immediately after the Legion of Honour.
  - As an in between medal for enlisted members, NCO and O(D) awarded the Legion of Honour for "combat actions", nowadays mostly done posthumously.
  - As a service medal, for long-serving NCOs.
- To generals and admirals who have been commanders-in-chief, as a supreme award for leadership. These general officers must already have been awarded the grand cross of the Legion of Honour.

== Award description ==
The Médaille militaire is a silver laurel wreath, 28 mm (1.1 in) in diameter, wrapped around a central gold medallion bearing the left profile of Marianne, effigy of the French Republic, the original 2nd Empire variant bore the left profile of Emperor Napoleon III. The central gold medallion is surrounded by a blue enamelled ring bearing the gilt inscription "RÉPUBLIQUE FRANÇAISE" (English: "FRENCH REPUBLIC") with a small gilt five-pointed star at the bottom for a 4th Republic award, three stars for a 5th Republic variant, the 3rd Republic variant bore the date 1870, the 2nd Empire variant bore the gilt inscription "LOUIS-NAPOLEON" in lieu of "RÉPUBLIQUE FRANÇAISE" and had flowers on both sides of the small star at the bottom. The original variant was topped by a silver imperial eagle with a loop through which the suspension ring passed, all other variants were and are topped by a device composed of a breastplate superimposed over crossed cannons, a naval anchor, sabres, swords and battle axes, to which the suspension ring passes through a loop for attachment to a ribbon. The reverse of the medallion is common to all variants since inception of the award, it bears the relief inscription on three lines "VALEUR ET DISCIPLINE" (English: "VALOUR AND DISCIPLINE") and is surrounded by a blue enamelled ring.

The ribbon of the Médaille militaire is 37 mm (1.5 in) wide, yellow in color with 6 mm-wide (0.24 in) green stripes on each edge. This ribbon was borrowed from the Order of the Iron Crown which it effectively replaced in France.

2nd Empire 1852–1870	3rd Republic 1870–1940	4th Republic 1946–1958	5th Republic 1958–present	Reverse common to all variants

== Recipients ==
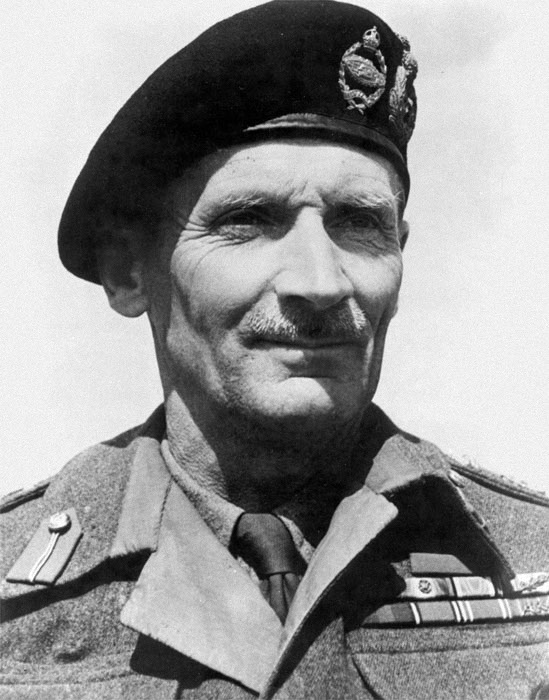
Field Marshal Bernard Montgomery, a recipient of the Médaille militaire

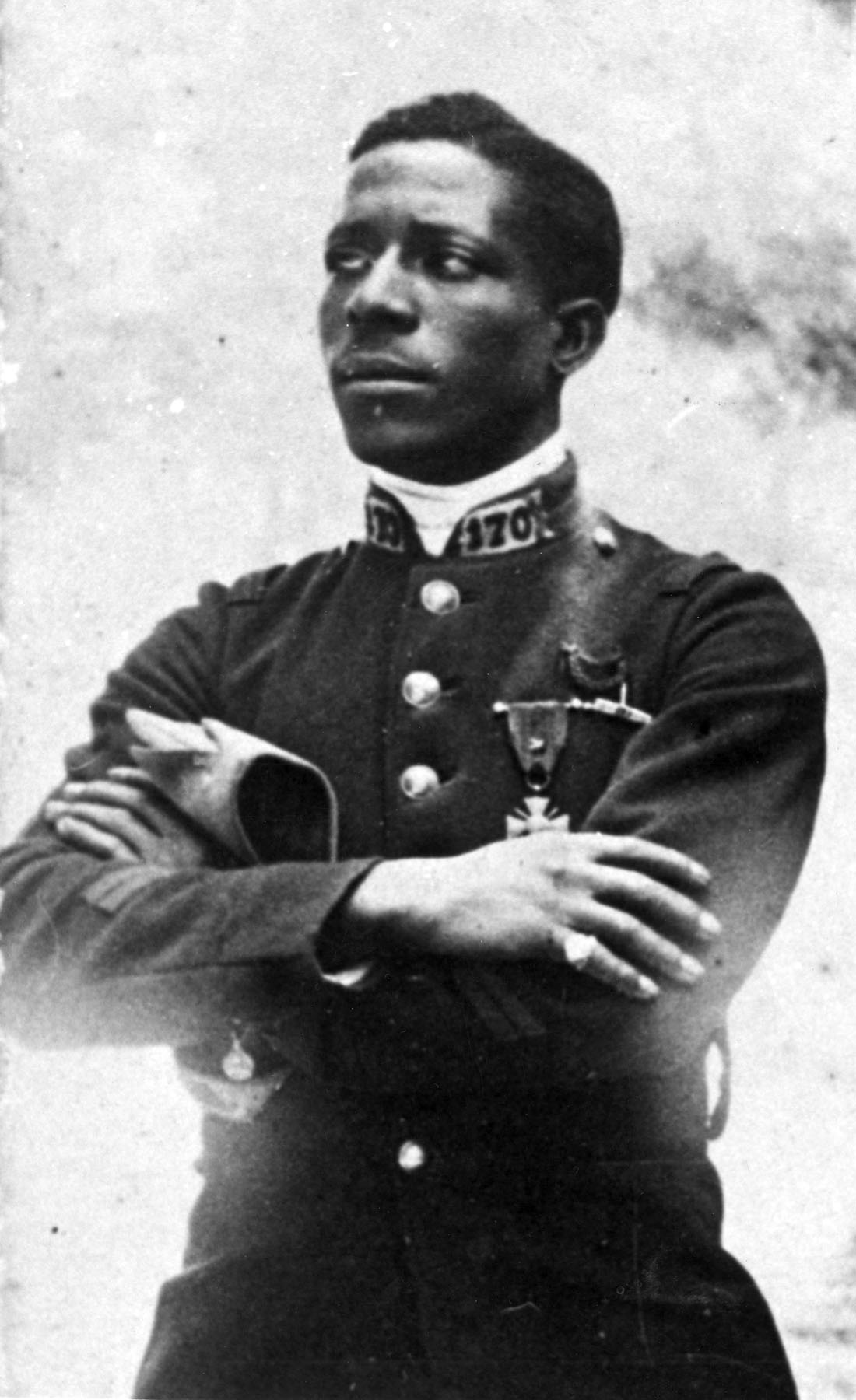
WW1 African American fighter pilot Eugene Bullard, a recipient of the Médaille militaire

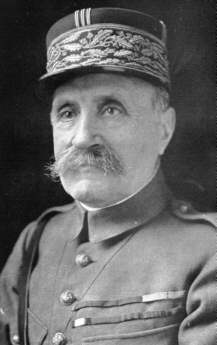
Marshal of France, Great Britain and Poland, Ferdinand Foch, a recipient of the Médaille militaire

The Médaille militaire was awarded in some number to British and allied forces (allies of the French Empire) during the Crimean War of 1854–1856 and in reasonably large numbers to allied forces in the 1914–1918 war. During the Second World War, the Médaille reached its highest numbers of foreign bestowals, most often to members of the British Army as well as to the United States military. The general's médaille was awarded to Winston Churchill, Franklin Delano Roosevelt and Josip Broz Tito, as supreme commanders of the UK, US and Yugoslav military forces, but to also effective military leaders, such as General of the Army Dwight Eisenhower, and to Admiral of the Fleet Andrew Cunningham, 1st Viscount Cunningham of Hyndhope.

== Unit award ==
In addition to the individual medal, the Médaille militaire is also authorized as a unit award to those military commands who display the same criteria of bravery as would be required for the individual medal. The médaille is displayed on the flag of these units. It is one of the rarest unit awards in the French military.

This unit award should not be confused with the fourragère de la médaille militaire, which is a cord suspended from the shoulder of a military uniform worn by members of units which had been mentioned in despatches. A fourragère aux couleurs du ruban de la médaille militaire (fourragère in the colours of the ribbon of the médaille militaire) is worn by units which had been mentioned four times, a fourragère aux couleurs de la légion d'honneur et de la médaille militaire (fourragère in the colours of the ribbons of the légion d'honneur and the médaille militaire) for units mentioned twelve times. Ten American units (most of them came from the U.S. 1st Infantry Division) can wear the fourragère de la médaille militaire.

== Notable French and foreign recipients (partial list) ==
The individuals listed below were recipients of the "Médaille Militaire":

- Fernand Bonnier de La Chapelle (posthumous)
- Private John Alexander VC United Kingdom
- Nurse and resistance fighter Berty Albrecht (posthumous)
- Marshal of France (1864) François Achille Bazaine
- World War 1 pilot Arthur Bluethenthal United States (posthumous)
- World War 1 African American fighter pilot Eugene Jacques Bullard United States
- Sergeant Louis-Ferdinand Céline
- Sergeant Eugène Chavant
- Yvonne Chollet (posthumous)
- Irène Curie in 1918 for working with radiography in World War I
- Marshal of France, Great Britain and Poland, Ferdinand Foch
- Prime Minister Sir Winston Leonard Spencer-Churchill United Kingdom
- USMC Sergeant Major Daniel Joseph "Dan" Daly United States
- Private Herman Davis United States
- First sergeant Samuel "Sam" Dreben United States
- President Dwight D. Eisenhower United States
- Rene Joyeuse FFL / OSS (Captain) France
- Corporal François Faber (posthumous)
- Colonel René Paul Fonck
- Corporal Edward Foster VC United Kingdom
- Russian flying ace Viktor Georgiyevich Fyodorov Russia
- Jean Gabin
- Police prefect Louis Lépine
- General of the Army Douglas MacArthur United States
- Capitaine Georges Felix Madon
- World War 2 fighter ace Paul-Joseph de Montgolfier
- Field Marshal Bernard Law Montgomery, 1st Viscount Montgomery of Alamein United Kingdom
- Norwegian Crown Prince and Chief of Defence Olav V Norway
- Marshal and Prime Minister Alexandros Papagos Greece
- Marshal Henri Philippe Benoni Omer Joseph Pétain
- Corporal Thomas A. Pope (Note: Also awarded the U.S. Medal of Honor, the British Distinguished Conduct Medal, and the Croix de guerre for bravery displayed in Hamel, France.) United States
- Father of the French Air Force, General Pierre Auguste Roques
- President Franklin D. Roosevelt United States (posthumous)
- Master corporal Pierre-Auguste Sarrus
- Master corporal Pierre Schoendoerffer
- Partisan leader and Prime Minister Josip Broz Tito Yugoslavia
- Susan Travers - French Foreign Legion
- Marthe Cohn
- Corporal Clarence Van Allen United States

=== Recent Recipients for Valour ===
Name	Unit	Rank	Date of effect	Notes
Adrien Moulard	Army, Armored Cavalry	Master Corporal (brigadier-chef)	20 November 2013	WIA
Renan Thierry	Army, Armored Cavalry	Master Corporal (brigadier-chef)	20 November 2013	WIA
Thomas Guillebaut	Air Force	Master Corporal (caporal chef)	13 December 2013	KIA; Also knight of the Legion of Honour
John Conte	Army, Foreign Legion	Private First Class (soldat de première classe)	29 April 2014	WIA
Geraldino Hoareaeu	Army, Foreign Legion	Private First Class (soldat de première classe)	29 April 2014	WIA
Marcel Kalafut	Army, Foreign Legion	Staff Sergeant (sergent-chef)	12 May 2014	KIA; Also knight of the Legion of Honour
Dejvid Nikolic	Army, Foreign Legion	Master Warrant Officer (adjudant-chef)	17 July 2014	WIA; Nikolic later died from his wounds and was created knight of the Legion of Honour
Antoine Le Quinio	Army, Troupes de Marine	Corporal (caporal)	19 July 2014	KIA; Also knight of the Legion of Honour
Nicolas Vokaer	Army, Troupes de Marine	Corporal (caporal)	19 July 2014	KIA; Also knight of the Legion of Honour
Teiva Li Hip	Army, Troupes de Marine	Corporal (brigadier)	28 July 2014	WIA
Alex Tite	Army, Troupes de Marine	Master Corporal 1st class (caporal-chef de première classe)	28 July 2014	WIA
Mickaël Galeran	Army, Artillery	Master Corporal (brigadier-chef)	2 October 2014	WIA
Thomas Dupuy	Air Force	Warrant Officer (adjudant)	3 November 2014	KIA; Also knight of the Legion of Honour
Samir Bajja	Armed Forces Fuel Service	Warrant Officer (agent technique en chef)	3 December 2014	KIA; Also knight of the Legion of Honour
François Fernandez	Army, Signal Corps	Warrant Officer (adjudant)	5 December 2014	WIA
Rémy Boullé	Air Force	Master Corporal (caporal-chef)	16 January 2015	WIA
Ludovic Sailly	Air Force	Warrant Officer (adjudant)	30 January 2015	WIA
Damien Legrand	Air Force	Staff Sergeant (sergent-chef)	30 January 2015	WIA
Mathieu Paulet	Air Force	Staff Sergeant (sergent-chef)	30 January 2015	WIA
Franck Poirot	Air Force	Master Corporal (caporal-chef)	30 January 2015	WIA
Yann Pollet	Army, Corps of Engineers	Staff Sergeant (sergent-chef)	13 March 2015	WIA
Aurélie Salel	Army, Corps of Engineers	Sergeant (sergent)	18 March 2015	WIA; Later died from her wounds and made Knight of the Legion of Honour
Florian Dumont	Army, Corps of Engineers	Master Corporal (caporal-chef)	4 May 2015	WIA; Later died from his wounds and made Knight of the Legion of Honour
Nicolas Caron	Army	Staff Sergeant (sergent-chef)	16 October 2015	WIA

== See also ==
- Ribbons of the French military and civil awards
