= Pierre Kaan =

French educator and resistance member

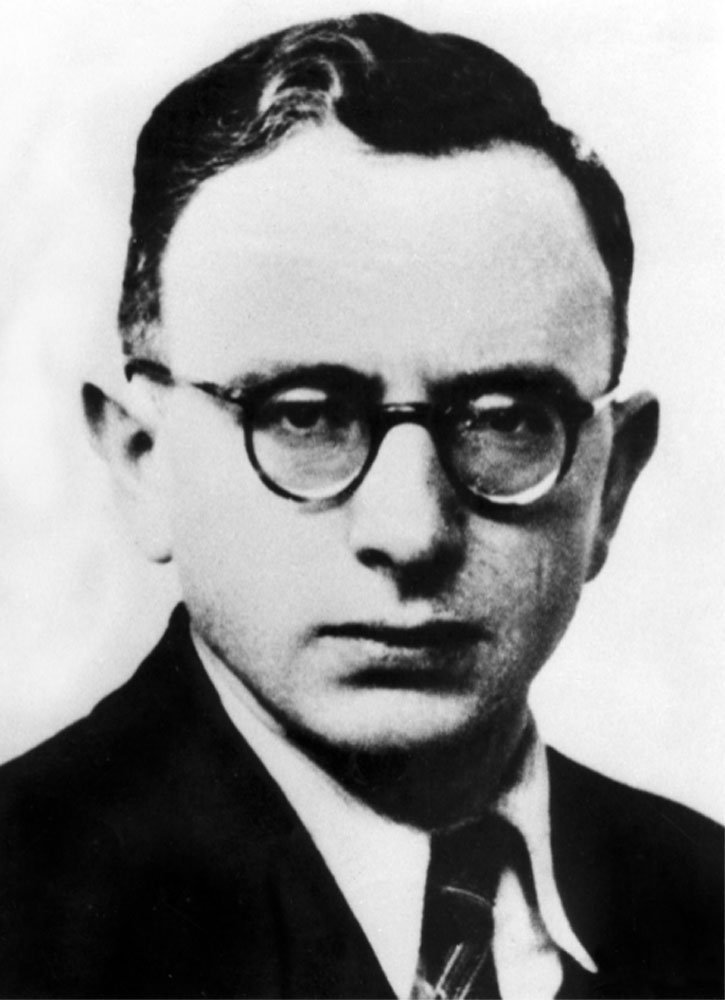

Personal details
- Born: 10 January 1903 Paris, France
- Died: 18 May 1945 (aged 42) České Budějovice, Czechoslovakia
- Citizenship: French
- Party: French Communist Party, Democratic Communist Circle
- Domestic partner: Marie Kaan
- Relations: André Kaan (brother)
- Education: Paris-Sorbonne University
- Profession: Philosophy teacher and leader of the French Resistance

Pierre Kaan (French: [pjεʀ kɑ̃] 10 January 1903 – 18 May 1945) was a professor of philosophy, Marxist essayist, and prominent member of the French Resistance during World War II.

== Activist, writer, teacher (1919–1939) ==
Front cover of the Critique Sociale's 8th edition featuring articles by Pierre Kaan, George Bataille and Boris Souvarine.

Pierre Kaan was born on 10 January 1903 in the 5th arrondissement of Paris. After a primary education often interrupted by health problems, Pierre Kaan entered in 1919 into khâgne, the preparatory classes for the entrance exams of École Normale Supérieure at the Lycée Louis-le-Grand. While at the Lycée Louis-le-Grand Kaan founded a literary review called la Gerbe du Quartier Latin, alongside fellow students Daniel Guérin, Georges Altman, and Paul Verdier. Pierre Kaan's attendance in the preparatory classes were interrupted when his parents sent him to Brittany to recover from recurring asthma attacks. Nevertheless, Pierre Kaan was awarded a diploma in philosophy by l'Academie de Paris in 1923, with a dissertation titled 'The sociological basis of Nietzsche's thought during his intellectualist period 1876–1882'.

Following a growing notoriety in French academic and Marxist circles in the early 1920s, Pierre Kaan was spotted by Boris Souvarine who placed him on the editing board of l'Humanité and shortly thereafter requested Kaan contribute as a writer and editor for the Bulletin Communiste.

During the 1920s Pierre Kaan contributed to a number of Jewish literary reviews. In 1925 Kaan began an editorial collaboration with Albert Cohen at the Revue Juive, a literary magazine founded by Cohen to review Jewish literature. And between 1927 and 1928, Pierre Kaan joined another literary review called Palestine, a Zionist literary review presided by Justin Godart, as its secretary.

Having passed the agrégation in philosophy in 1928, Pierre Kaan was named associate professor of literature and philosophy at a secondary school in Montargis. However, Kaan resigned from his position in September 1929 in order to fulfill his military obligations, which he completes in November and is thereby named professor in another secondary school, this time in Nogent-le-Rotrou.

At odds over the party's close relationship with the Soviet Union, Pierre Kaan quit the French Communist Party (PCF) in 1929 and joined Souvarine's new group, the Cercle Communiste Démocratique, whose members included Simone Weil, Georges Bataille, and Raymond Queneau.

In 1931 Pierre Kaan began his involvement with Boris Souvarine's La Critique Sociale joining Bataille, Weil, Queneau, Lucien Laurat and other writers, philosophers and economists to revue letters and ideas for what would become a widely read publication during the 1930s.

== Résistant (1939–1944) ==
Shortly after the speech made by Marshal Philippe Pétain on 17 June, Pierre Kaan unsuccessfully attempted to join the resistance group France Libre. Kaan thereby tasked himself of uniting and regrouping all those who shared the will to continue fighting against the Nazis. Alongside former comrades and old friends (Jean Cavaillès and Leo Hamon in Toulouse), Kaan participated in the founding of the group Libération-Sud. In February 1942, Pierre Kaan enlisted in the Forces Françaises Combattantes, handing his engagement personally to Jean Moulin and Leo Morandat when they arrived to visit him at his home in Montluçon. Kaan undertook a number of resistance operations with Libération-Sud around the Montluçon area alongside members of the entourage of Montluçon's Mayor, Marx Dormoy. Pierre Kaan's resistance activities in Montluçon ranged from painting anti-Nazi inscriptions on walls, coordinating the distribution of political tracts, compiling reports destined for headquarters of the Free French Forces in London, and during 1942, Kaan reconnoitered the surrounding territory to find appropriate landing zones for parachute operations and clandestine landings. On 6 January 1942, Kaan plays an important part in organising a large demonstration against the departure of workers following a speech made by Pierre Laval – the Nazi collaborating Prime Minister of the Vichy Régime. Following the success of his operations in Montluçon, Pierre Kaan is named Jean Moulin's deputy responsible for safeguarding transport and communication links between Lyon and the occupied half of France.

== Arrest, deportation, imprisonment, liberation (1944–1945) ==
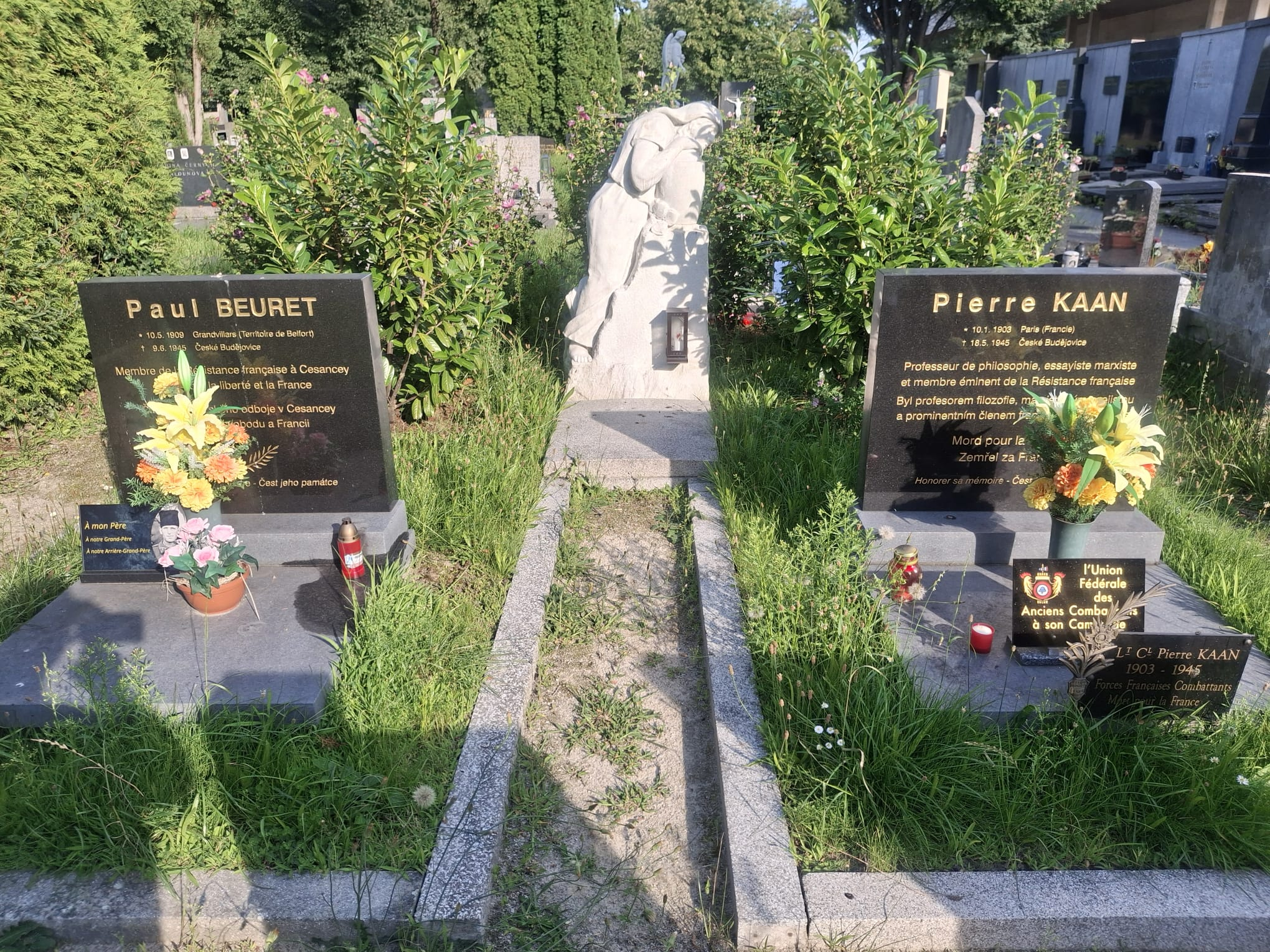
Grave of Mr. Pierre Kaan in Cemetery of St. Otýlie, České Budějovice, Czech Republic – GPS coordinates (48.9992167N, 14.4835719E)

Denounced by a close collaborator in the winter of 1943, Pierre Kaan was arrested by the Gestapo on 29 December on the steps of Port-Royal métro station in Paris, tortured and then deported to Buchenwald concentration camp. From Buchenwald, Pierre Kaan was deported to Gleina, liberated by Czech anti-fascist fighters, and died a few days later, exhausted and stricken by Typhus and Tuberculosis in České Budějovice hospital on 18 May 1945. Pierre Kaan is buried at the St. Otýlie Cemetery in České Budějovice, Czech Republic. Paul Beuret, also a member of the French Resistance, is also buried next to him.

Boris Souvarine on Pierre Kaan:

I owe a special mention to Pierre Kaan, who had been my close collaborator at l'Humanité after the Tours Congress as well as in other publications I was responsible for. After the disaster of 1940, I discovered in him the first serious résistant, effective and authentic. At that time I did not share his conviction... since I thought the french disaster irreversible. Having returned to France after six years spent living in America, I experienced the pain of learning that Pierre Kaan and Amédée Dunois, deported to Germany, would never come back, victims of their devotion to a certain vision of France.

== Honours and decorations ==
In recognition of the operations Pierre Kaan led and undertook during the war, Kaan received three French and one British decoration. On 12 May 1948, the official journal of the French Government announced that Kaan had been posthumously decorated with Knight of the Legion of Honour, Medal of the Resistance with Rosette, War Cross with silver palm. In the same year, the British Government also decorated Kaan posthumously with the King's Military Commendation for Brave Conduct.

Ribbon	Medal	Decoration	Country
		Knight of the Legion of Honour	France
		Medal of the Resistance with Rosette	France
		War Cross with silver palm 1939–1945	France
NA		King's Military Commendation for Brave Conduct	United Kingdom

== Publications ==
=== Articles ===
- Kaan, P., 1928. 'Étude sur l'ouvrage d'Henri de Man: Au-delà du Marxisme'. Bulletin Communiste, No. 27–28, April–July.
- Kaan, P., 1931. 'Dogme et verité'. La Critique Sociale, No. 2, July, pp. 53–55.
- Kaan, P., Laurat, L., 1931. 'A propos des lettres de Sorel'. La Critique Sociale, No. 3, October, pp. 107–?.
- Kaan, P., 1933. 'Matérialisme et communisme'. La Critique Sociale, No. 8, April, pp. 67–69.
- Kaan, P., 1939. 'La logique de l'irrationalisme'. In: François George ed. 1987. La Liberté de l'Esprit: Visages de la Résistance. Lyon, France: La Manufacture.
- Kaan, P., 1940. 'Stalinisme ou hitlérisme dans une Europe organisée'. Les Nouveaux Cahiers, April, No. 56. Reprinted in 1998 in Commentaire, 'Mémoire et oubli du communisme', p. 379.

=== Translations ===
- Kaan, P., Duff, A.B., 1926. l'Exemplar Humanae Vitae by Uriel Da Costa.
