= Boris Souvarine =

French Marxist, communist activist, essayist and journalist (1895–1984)

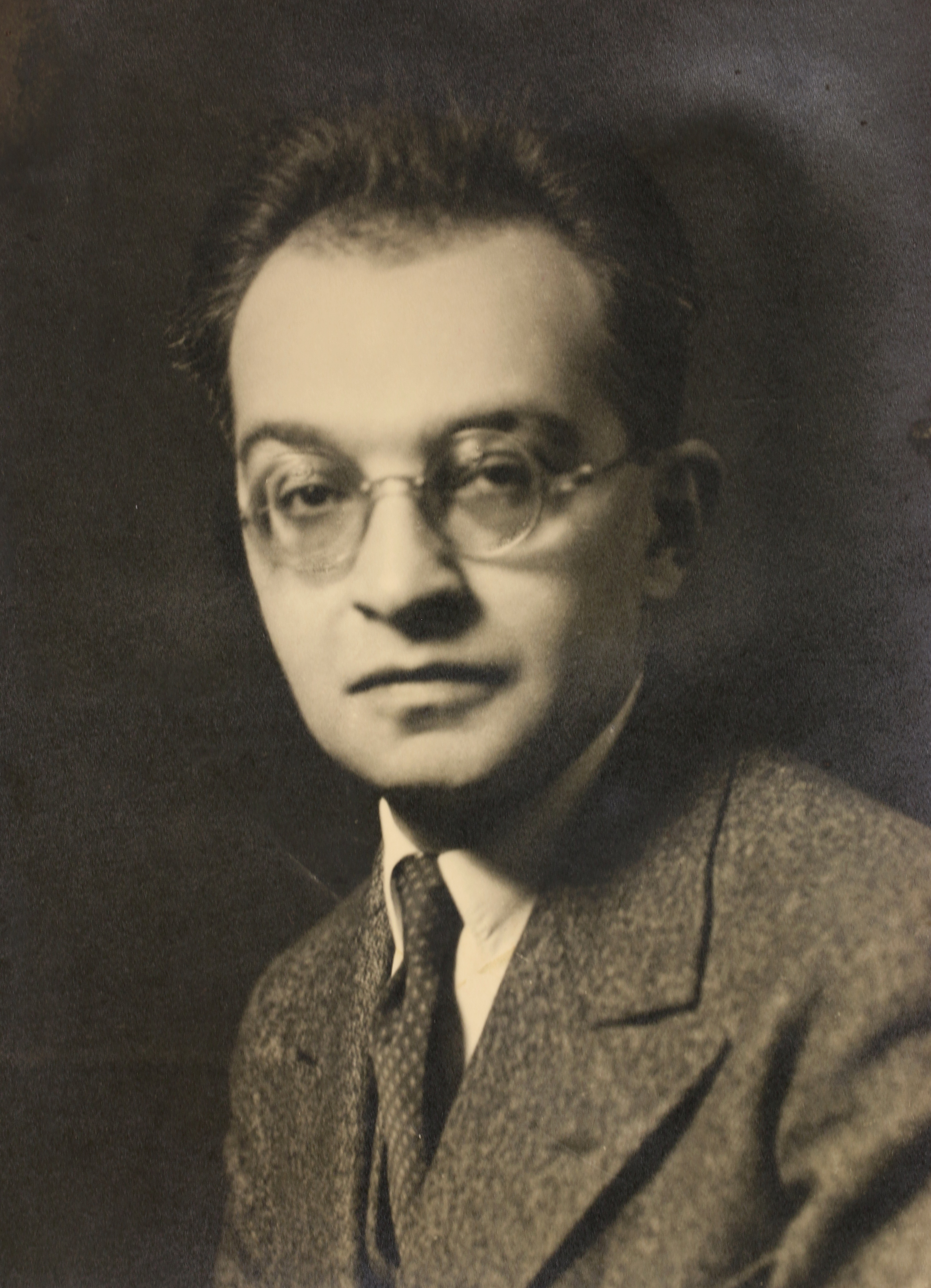
- Born: Борис Константинович Лифшиц; Boris Konstantinovich Lifschitz; 1 November 1895; Kiev, Kiev Governorate, Russian Empire
- Died: 1 November 1984 (aged 89); Paris, France
- Occupations: Activist, journalist
- Political party: French Communist Party; Democratic Communist Circle
- Partner: Colette Peignot

Boris Souvarine (born Boris Konstantinovich Lifschitz, 1 November 1895 – 1 November 1984), also known as Varine, was a French Marxist, communist activist, essayist and journalist.

A founding member of the French Communist Party, Souvarine is noted for being the only non-Bolshevik communist to have been a member of all three leading bodies of the Comintern for three years in succession. He famously authored the first biography of Joseph Stalin, published in 1935 as Staline, Aperçu Historique du Bolchévisme (Stalin, Historic Overview of Bolshevism) and kept close correspondence with Vladimir Lenin and Leon Trotsky until their deaths.

His nonconformism and early criticism of Stalin made him break away from the party in 1924. In the decades that followed, Souvarine continued publishing as a leading Sovietologist and anti-Stalinist. He was also the founder of the Institute of Social History and an author, historian, publisher and journalist.

== Early life ==
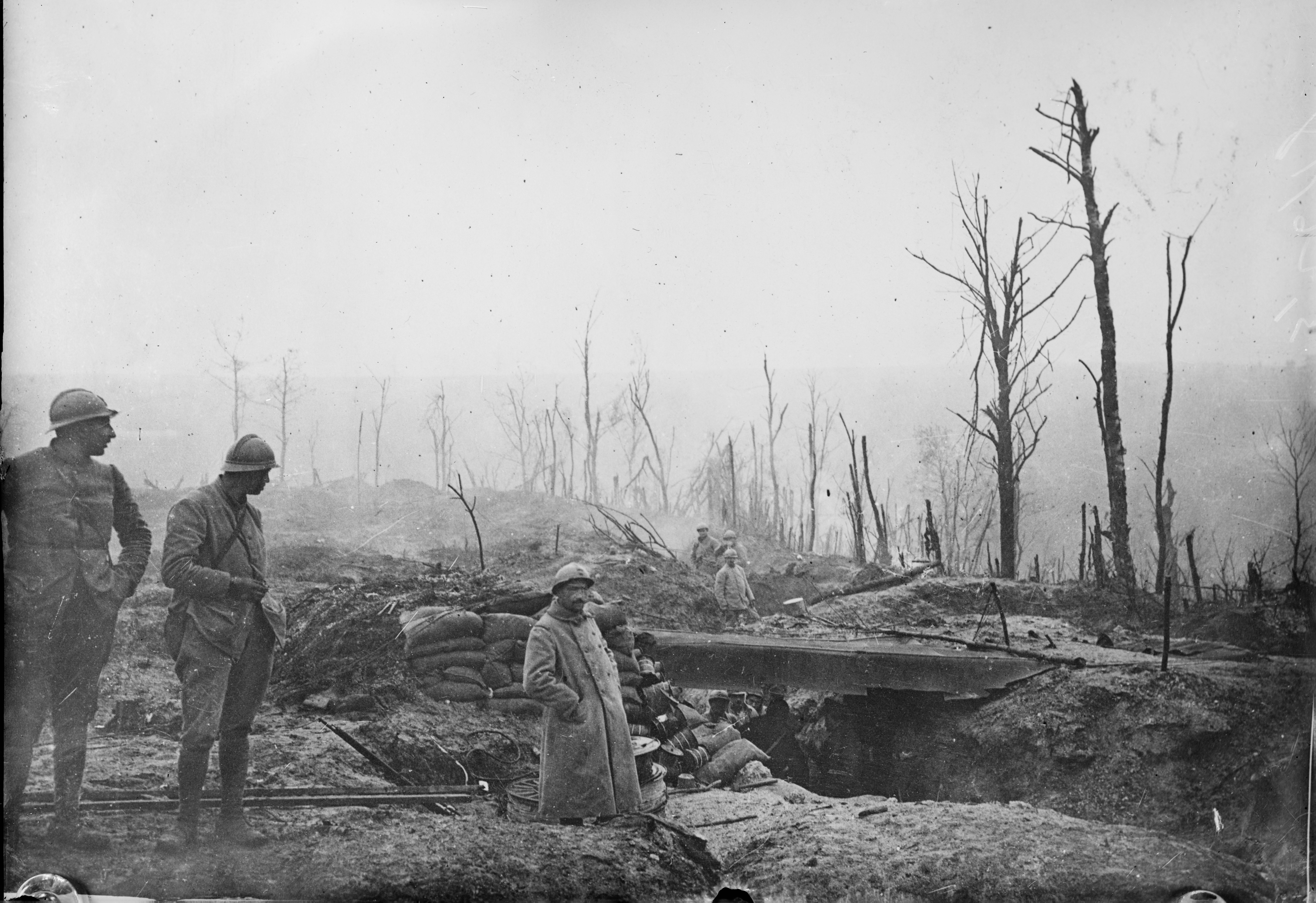
Souvarine was strongly affected by World War I.

Souvarine was born Boris Konstantinovich Lifschitz in Kyiv to a Jewish family. Souvarine's family moved to Paris in 1897, where he became a socialist activist from a young age. He trained as a jewelry designer.

At the age of 14, he came into contact with the French socialist movement while he was working as an apprentice in an aviation factory. He began to attend meetings held by Jean Jaurès.

Souvarine experienced his first trauma with the outbreak of World War I. Mobilised as part of the French army in 1914, he quickly discovered the horrors of trench warfare and in March 1915, he lost his older brother who died fighting on the front-line.

War pushed Souvarine into politics and the antimilitarist movement. He joined the French Section of the Workers' International (SFIO). in 1916 and began contributing to publications of the antiwar socialist minority like Le Populaire, signing articles with the pseudonym he held onto for the rest of his life. He borrowed the name Souvarine from a character in Émile Zola's Germinal.

== October Revolution ==
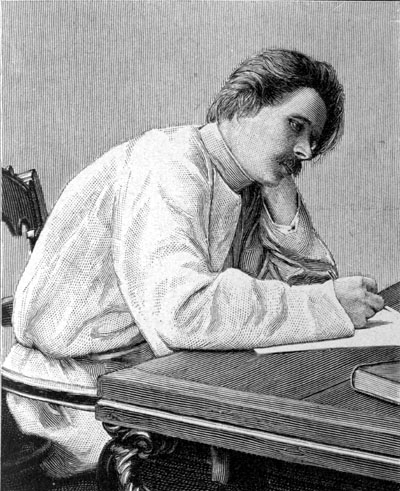
Following the October Revolution, Maxim Gorky employed Souvarine as a correspondent for Novaya Zhizn.

Souvarine's journalistic reputation grew rapidly during the war years as a talented, subtle writer and a skillful polemicist. He welcomed with fervour the Russian Revolution in 1917 and his Russian skills helped him relay the events closely to left-wing circles in France. In the same year, Souvarine was hired to Maxim Gorky's Novaya Zhizn as a correspondent in France.

Following the Bolshevik-led revolution in November 1917, Souvarine wrote:

It is to be feared that, for Lenin and his friends, the 'dictatorship of the proletariat', must be a dictatorship of Bolsheviks and their leader. This could become a terror for the Russian working class, and eventually, the global proletariat. [...] What we wish we could see was agreement between socialists to organise a stable power, that truly becomes the power of the people and not the power of a man.

== Creation of the Communist Party ==
In 1919, Souvarine joined the committee of the Communist International and became one of its most active members, helping to diffuse large numbers of political and propagandist literature across Europe.

In one of these leaflets, Souvarine wrote:

The Socialist-Communist parties must attempt to create a proletarian democracy that will eliminate class by abolishing economic privilege, and of which the organs are soviets, i.e. peasant and worker councils—a new type of organisation governing itself.

In 1920, he was elected delegate to the SFIO's Congress where he advocates for cross-party membership to the Communist International. In March 1920, he created the widely read and influential Bulletin Communiste as a twice monthly mouth-piece of the Third International.

=== Tours Congress ===
Souvarine's motion at the SFIO's Tours Congress founded what is today the French Communist Party.

Souvarine was arrested on 17 May 1920 in a government crackdown that accused a number of communist leaders and revolutionary activists of anarchist plots and conspiracy. Because of a lack of substantive evidence, he was released shortly after with Fernand Loriot and Pierre Monatte, and the three were all acquitted in March 1921.

In prison, Souvarine buried himself in his journalistic, political and essay writing, writing almost non-stop for Bulletin communiste, l'Humanité, La Vague and La Vie Ouvrière. It was then that he composed the famous motion for the Tours Congress that would eventually split the SFIO and form the French Communist Party.

In December 1920, Loriot and Souvarine were named honorary presidents of the Tours Congress. Over 75% of congress delegates adopted the Souvarine motion that created the French Section of the Communist International. Much later, once the party became fully Stalinised, it became known as the French Communist Party.

== Break with the Communist Party ==
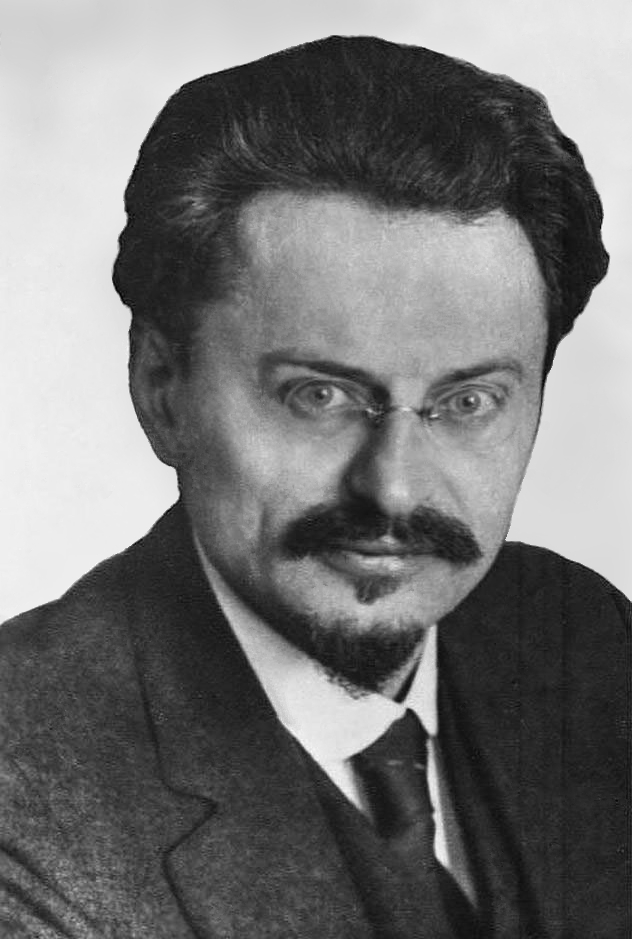
Having defended Trotsky against Stalin in the Comintern during the 1920s, Souvarine kept up close correspondence with him until his death.

As an executive member of the Comintern, Souvarine kept in regular contact with Leon Trotsky. When Trotsky became the target of vilification in the All-Union Communist Party, Souvarine conveyed the French Communist Party's support for Trotsky to the Bolsheviks' 13th Congress in 1924. He became associated with the communist opposition against Joseph Stalin. Souvarine was removed from his official roles in the French Communist Party in early 1924 and was expelled by the Comintern in July.

He became close to anti-Stalinist communist figures in Paris (including Marcel Body, Christian Rakovsky and the writer Panait Istrati). In October 1925, Souvarine relaunched the Bulletin communiste and in February 1926, he organised its supporters in the Marx–Lenin Communist Circle. In the late 1920s, he remained active in the communist opposition, was close to Pierre Monatte and Alfred Rosmer and wrote in La Révolution Prolétarienne. He shared some positions with the Left Opposition as well with the so-called Right Opposition, but he refused to take part in its international conference called by Heinrich Brandler and August Thalheimer in Berlin in 1930. The Marx–Lenin Communist Circle was renamed the Democratic Communist Circle (Cercle Communise Démocratique).

The Bulletin communiste was continued, and Souvarine also launched La critique sociale. His growing break with Trotsky was indicated by his analysis of the Soviet Union as state capitalist, in contrast to Trotsky's designation of it as a degenerated workers' state.

In 1936, Souvarine encouraged the newly exiled writer Victor Serge to continue his political activity. By now, Trotsky harshly criticised Souvarine's personal characteristics and stated that Souvarine was a journalist, rather than a revolutionary. Serge's defense of Souvarine and other anti-Stalinists who deviated from Trotsky's positions was among the factors that led to distrust between Serge and Trotsky.

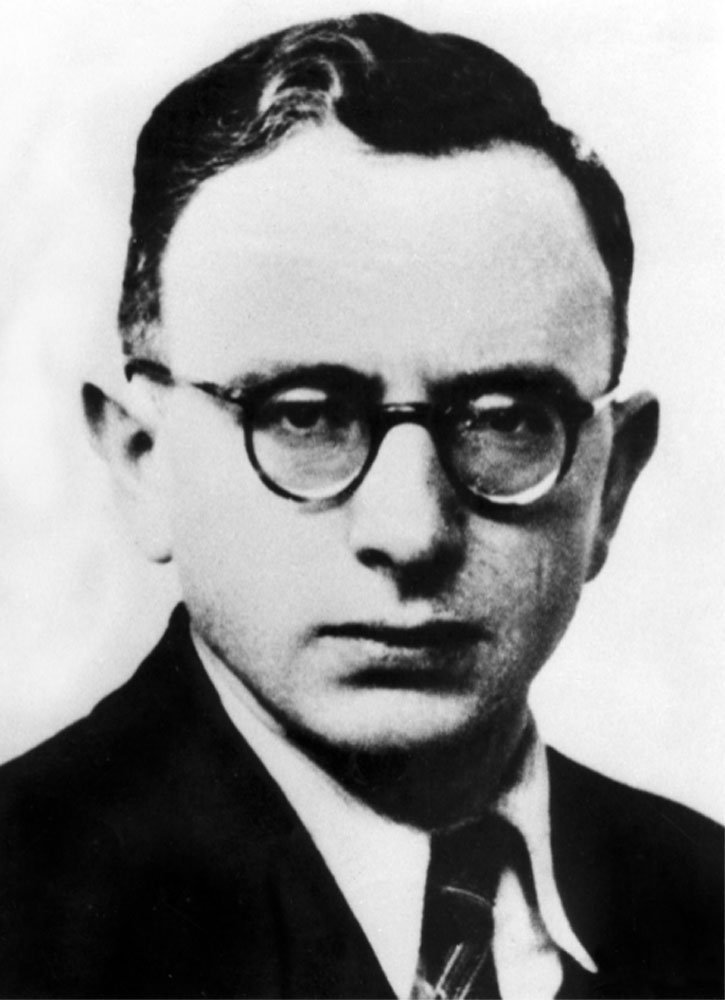
Souvarine worked closely with Pierre Kaan, a prominent member of the French Resistance with whom he edited l'Humanité and La Critique Sociale in the 1920s and the 1930s.

In 1935, Souvarine created the Institute for Social History, a French branch of the International Institute of Social History of Amsterdam, which was originally created to preserve the archives of the Social Democratic Party of Germany. He was the secretary general while Alexandre-Marie Desrousseaux was the president and Boris Nicolaevsky was the director. In November 1936, burglars stole the archives of Trotsky that were deposited at the institute. In 1940, the institute was looted by the Nazis, who brought some of its collections to Germany.

After World War II and during the Cold War, Souvarine moved towards a reformist politics and increasingly adopted anti-Soviet positions. After the German occupation of France, he took refuge in Marseille, but was arrested in 1940. He was freed with the help of his friend Henri Rollin and emigrated to the US After his return to France (in 1947), and with the help of Jacques Chevallier, he recreated the Institute of Social History. The institute published the magazine Le Contrat Social.

== Later life ==
Souvarine was involved in a variety of organizations and journals (e.g., Est-Ouest and Le Contrat social) of the anti-Stalinist left in France, publishing frequently on the Soviet Union, Stalin and Stalinism. Souvarine also criticised Lenin. His criticisms of Stalinism were important sources for some less orthodox Trotskyists, such as C. L. R. James, who translated his Stalin biography into English.

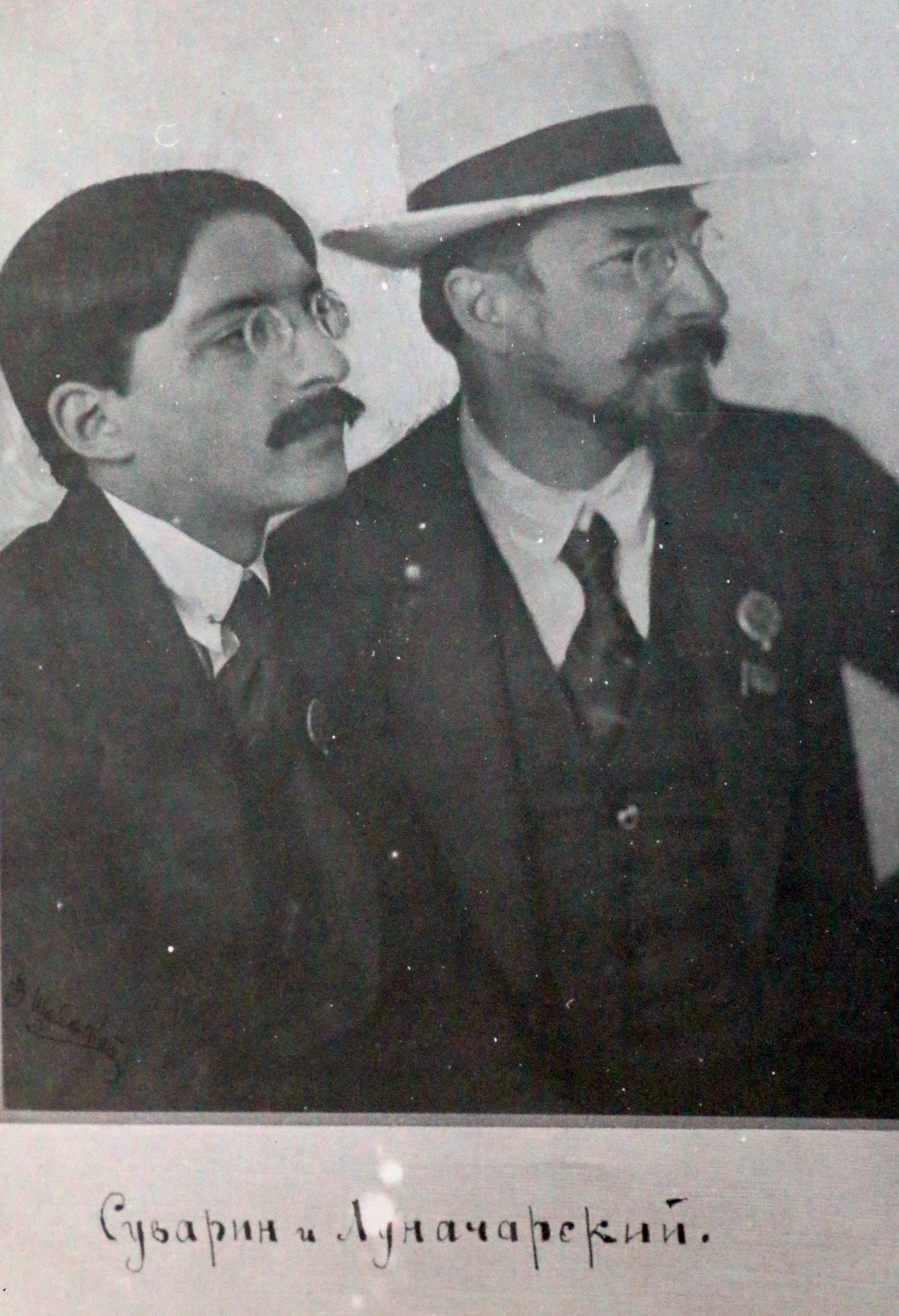
Portrait of Souvarine (left) and Anatoly Lunacharsky

In 1976, declining health forced him to abandon his position at the Institute of Social History. He died in Paris on 1 November 1984.

== Works ==
=== Original French publications ===
- Souvarine, B., 1935. Staline, aperçu historique du bolchévisme, Paris, Plon (re-edited Champ libre 1978 and 1985, then éditions Ivrea 1992).
- Souvarine, B., 1936. À travers le pays des Soviets, under the pseudonyme of Motus, Paris, Éditions de France.
- Souvarine, B., 1937. Cauchemar en URSS , Paris, Revue de Paris, (re-edited Agone, 2001).
- Souvarine, B., 1937. Ouvriers et paysans en URSS, Paris, Librairie du travail, (re-edited Agone, 2001).
- Souvarine, B., 1971. Un Pot-pourri de Khrouchtchev : à propos de ses souvenirs, Paris, éditions Spartacus.
- Souvarine, B., 1972. Le Stalinisme, Paris, Spartacus.
- Souvarine, B., 1981. Autour du congrès de Tours, Paris, Champ Libre.
- Souvarine, B., 1982. L'observateur des deux mondes et autres textes, Paris, La Différence.
- Souvarine, B., 1983. La Critique Sociale – 1931-1934, Paris, La Différence.
- Souvarine, B., 1985. Souvenirs sur Isaac Babel, Panaït Istrati, Pierre Pascal - followed by Lettre à Alexander Solzhenitsyn, Paris, éditions Gérard Lebovici.
- Souvarine, B., 1985. À contre-courant (collection of texts from 1925 to 1939), Paris, Denoël.
- Souvarine, B., 1990. Controverse avec Soljenitsyne, Paris, Allia Editions.
- Souvarine, B., 1998. Chroniques du mensonge communiste, texts chosen by Branko Lazitch and Pierre Rigoulot, Plon.
- Souvarine, B., 2007. Sur Lénine, Trotsky et Staline (1978–79), interviews with Branko Lazitch and Michel Heller; Boris by Michel Heller.
- Boris Souvarine additionally wrote anonymously one of the three parts of Vers l'autre flamme, published under Panaït Istrati's name in 1929. Re-edition, 1997. L'URSS en 1930, introduced by Charles Jacquier, Paris, éditions Ivrea.

=== Translated into English ===
- Souvarine, B., 2005. Stalin: A Critical Survey of Bolshevism, Kessinger Publishing Legacy Reprint Series.*
- Souvarine, B., 1964. Stalin, Hoover Institution for War, Revolution and Peace, University of Stanford.*
- Souvarine, B., 2010. The Third International, Bibliobazaar Reprints.
- Souvarine, B., 1939, Stalin: A Critical Survey of Bolshevism, Longmans, Green & Co. New York
- Rosmer, A; Souvarine, B; Fabrol, E; Clavez, A (2001). Richardson, Al (ed.). Trotsky and the Origins of Trotskyism. Francis Boutle Publishers. ISBN 190342707X.
