= Agnès de La Barre de Nanteuil =

French Resistance worker

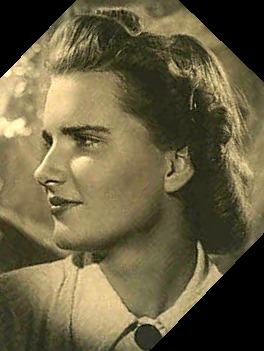
Agnès de La Barre de Nanteuil

Agnès de La Barre de Nanteuil, also Agnès de Nanteuil, (1922–1944) was a French Resistance worker during the Second World War who helped allied airmen escape from the Nazis in occupied France. She died on 13 August 1944 at the Paray-le-Monial railway station from injuries she sustained while being deported by train to Germany by the Gestapo.

== Early life ==
Born at Neuilly-sur-Seine on 17 September 1922, Agnès de La Barre de Nanteuil was the daughter of Gabriel de la Barre de Nanteuil and Sabine Cochin, both of noble ancestry. The first of six children, she was brought up in Paris and in Brittany, first at Theix, then at Vannes. Initially a difficult and headstrong child, when she was 15 she turned a new leaf and became a devout Christian. She also became a keen member of the scouts.

== Resistance work ==
With the German occupation of 1940 extending to Vannes, where the family had moved following the death of her father, de Nanteuil joined the Red Cross where she obtained her first-aid diploma in 1942. Like her mother, she joined the resistance, where she was known as Agent Claude. Still only 20, together with her sister, Catherine, she became a second lieutenant in the Secret Army of Brittany. She disguised herself as a scout leader, riding her bicycle from place to place in order to transmit messages hidden in her handlebars or in her shoes. Her resistance work included placing landing lights for allied parachuters. Returning home after one such operation on 13 March 1944, she found the Gestapo were waiting for her. Her name and those of several others had been disclosed under torture by a member of her resistance group.

Despite being tortured in the prisons of Vannes and Rennes, she revealed nothing. On 3 August 1944, together with her sister, other resistance workers and allied prisoners, her deportation to Germany began in a cramped cattle car. As the train was crossing France, it was attacked at Langeais by British fighter planes and de Nanteuil was wounded. It was later reported that she had been shot by a Nazi soldier in order to prevent her escape.

Despite being hospitalized in Tours for a time, on 10 August, placed on a stretcher, she was again put on a train for Germany. On 13 August at 9 pm she died at the railway station of Paray le Monial. She pardoned the resistance worker who had revealed her name and ended her life in prayer, accompanied by 35 women from various parts of France who were enchanted by her bravery. She was initially buried in the local cemetery in the grave of the doctor who had certified her death. Her remains were later moved to the family grave in Vannes.

== Awards ==
In 1947, she was posthumously awarded the Resistance Medal by Charles de Gaulle and in 2002, she was named patroness of the 26th Class of the Military School of Saint-Cyr-Coëtquidan.
