= Jérôme Peignot =

French writer (1926–2025)

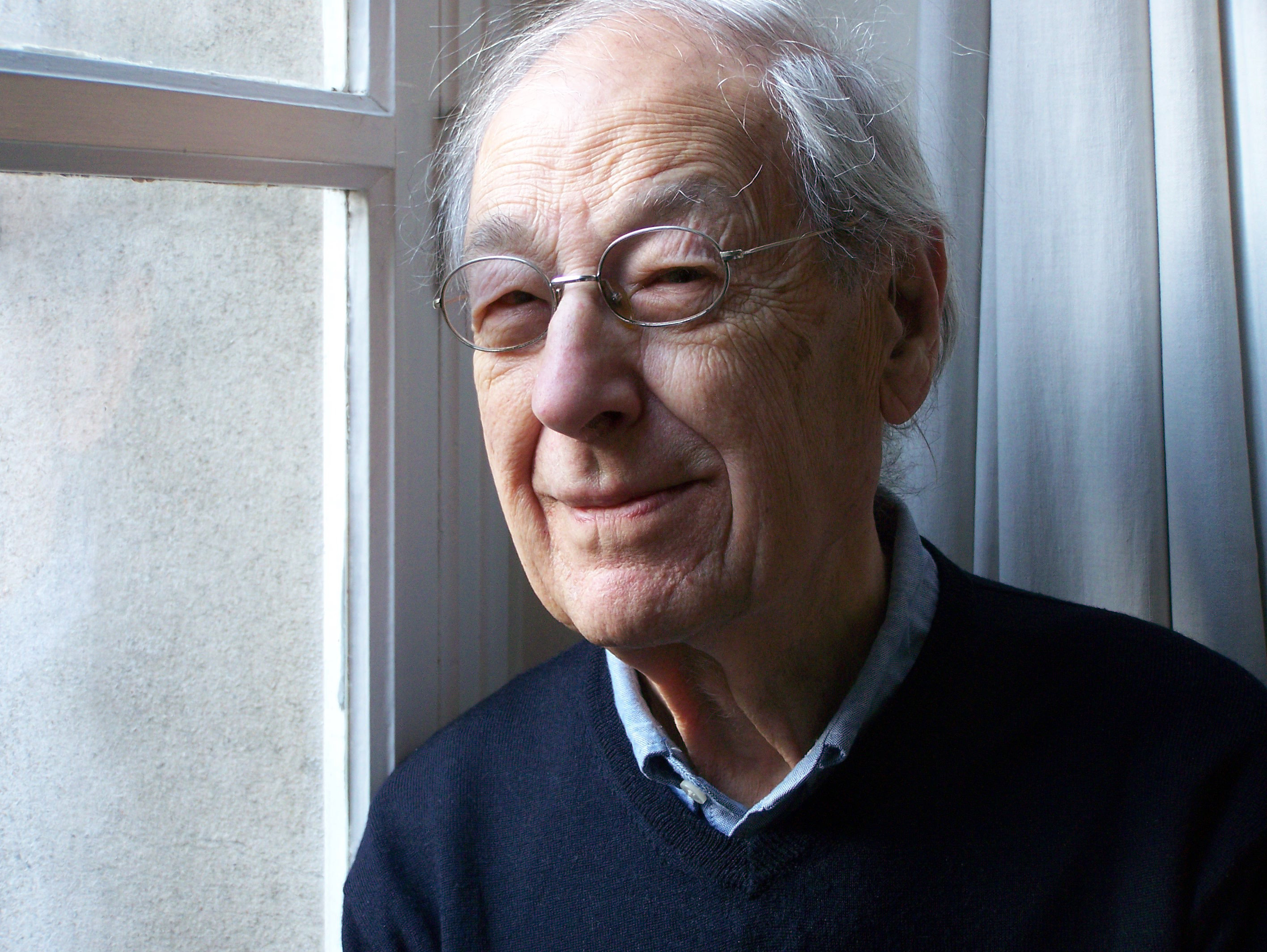
- Peignot in 2017
- Born: 10 June 1926; 7th arrondissement of Paris, France
- Died: 19 July 2025 (aged 99)
- Occupations: Novelist, poet
- Known for: Acousmatic sound
- Awards: Prix Sainte-Beuve

Jérôme Georges André Peignot (French: [ʒeʁom pɛɲo]; 10 June 1926 – 19 July 2025) was a French novelist, poet, pamphleteer, and an expert in typography. The author of some thirty books, he was awarded the Prix Sainte-Beuve, took part in publishing the writings of Laure (his aunt Colette Peignot), as well as a major anthology on "Typoésie". He was the grandson of Georges Peignot, typographer and director of the foundry G. Peignot et Fils. Peignot was also known for having launched the concept of acousmatic sound in the 1960s. His mother was soprano singer Suzanne Peignot. Jérôme Peignot died on 19 July 2025, at the age of 99.

== Select works ==
- Sonnets. Deux quatrains, deux tercets et à Paris deux rives. Photographs: Élisabeth Leroy-Viviane. Preface: Frédéric Sojcher. Paris: Éditions de l'amandier. 2015. ISBN 978-2355162626.
- Pierre Leroux, inventeur du Socialisme. Paris: Chryseis édition. 2014. (First edition: Klincksieck, 1989)
- Les jeux de l'amour et du language. Paris: Rue des cascades. 2012. Essai. (First edition: 1974)
- Le gai savoir de la mort. Paris: Éd. des cendres. 2010. ISBN 978-2-86742-173-0.
- Les cent sonnets de Ker Borny. Paris: Éd. des cendres. 2008. ISBN 978-2867421600.
- Broyer du bleu. Paris: Éditions du Rocher, Paris (197 pages). 2005. ISBN 2268056139.
- Marcel Cohen; Jérôme Peignot, eds. (2005). Histoire et art de l'écriture. Paris: Robert Laffont, coll. « Bouquins », 1179 pages.
- Typoèmes. Paris: Seuil, 240 pages. 2004.
- Je vous donne de mes nouvelles. Paris: Éd. des cendres. 2001.
- Petit traité de la vignette. Paris: Imprimerie nationale. 2000.
- Peignot, Jérôme; Roche, Anne, eds. (1999). Laure. Une rupture (1934). Paris: Éd. des Cendres.
- Puzzle II. Belgique: Talus d’approche. 1996. Préface de Bernard Noël
- Le Petit Peignot. Paris: Éd. des Cendres. 1996.
- L'alphabet des Lettres, ou le petit hamburgefons. Paris: Imprimerie nationale. 1995.
- Un printemps à Pékin. Paris: Calmann-Lévy. 1993.
- Typoésie. Paris: Imprimerie nationale éditions. 2005. (First edition: 1993)
- Affiches-posters d'Air France, 1933-1983. Paris: F. Hazan. 1988.
- Moïse ou la preuve par l'alphabet de l'existence de Iahvé. Petit essai d'épigraphie polémique. Paris: Jérôme Millon. 2005. (First edition: 1988)
- Puzzle I. Paris: Âge d’homme. 1990. (First edition: 1986)
- La Tour. Paris: Christian Bourgois. 1971.
- L'amour a ses princes. Paris: Gallimard. 1967.
- De l'écriture à la typographie. Paris: Gallimard, coll. "Idées". 1967.
- Grandeur et misère d'un employé de bureau. Paris: Gallimard. 1965.
- L'or des fous, Jérômiades III. Paris: Seuil. 1962. Prix Sainte-Beuve.
- Jérômiades II. Paris: Seuil. 1959.
- Jérômiades I. Paris: Seuil. 1957.
