= Suzanne Peignot =

French soprano (1895–1993)

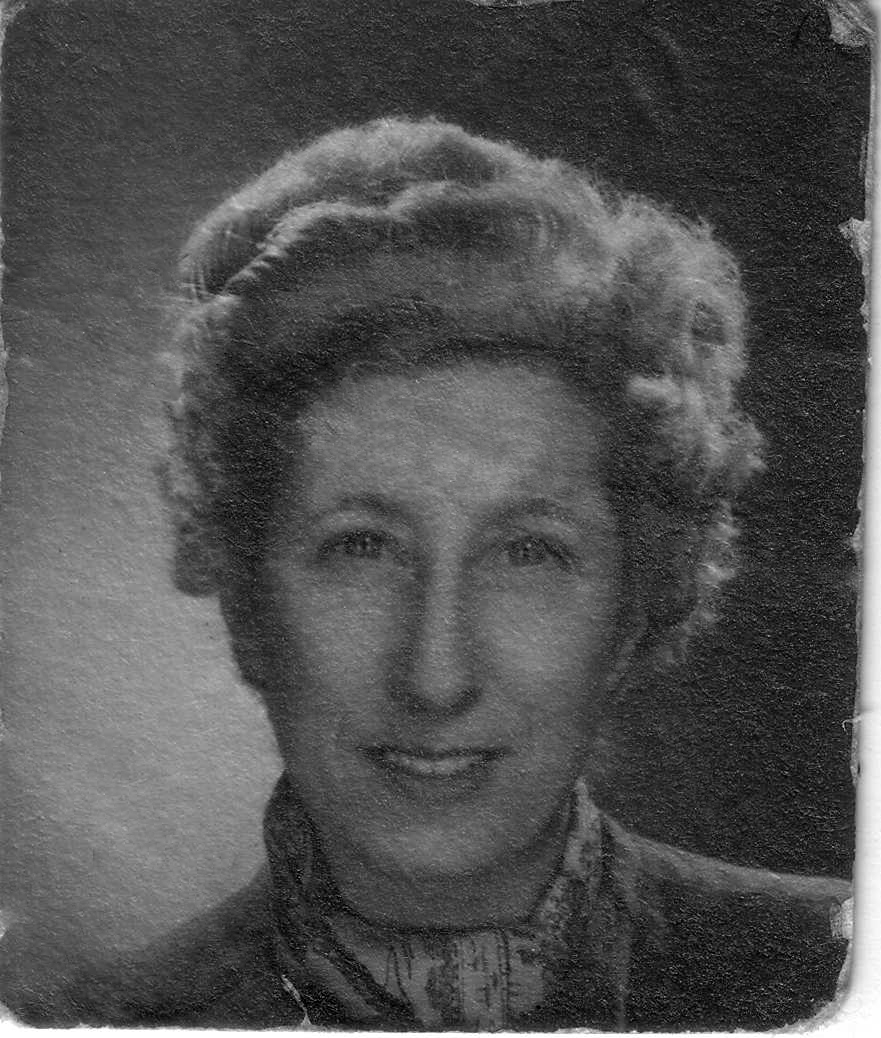
- Peignot in 1940
- Born: Suzanne Jeanne Marie Rivière; 25 September 1895; Compiègne, France
- Died: 25 April 1993 (aged 97); Paris, France
- Occupation: Soprano
- Organizations: Quatuor vocal Suzanne Peignot

Suzanne Jeanne Marie Peignot (French: [syzan ʒan maʁi pɛɲo]), née Rivière (French: [ʁivjɛʁ]; 25 September 1895 – 25 April 1993), was a French soprano, a privileged interpreter of the group Les Six. Her friends nicknamed her la Reine des mouettes ("the Queen of the Seagulls"), an allusion to one of the melodies she successfully sang. As for him, Erik Satie had nicknamed her ma très petite da-dame.

== Life ==
Born in Compiègne, she was the daughter of cavalry officer Augustin Marie Emmanuel Rivière (1867-1931) and his first wife Marie Madeleine Carbonnier (1873-1906). Rivière's childhood was marked by military life (and its incessant traveling: Compiègne in 1894, Provins in 1911, Dinan in 1912, Rennes in 1914, the front line) and by the death of her mother when she was only 11 years old she was placed with her paternal aunt Cécile Rivière (1862-1917), mother of historian Bernard Faÿ, her cousin. She then returned at the age of 14 to live with her recently remarried father.

=== Training ===
During the conflict, Rivière lived in Paris with her Parisian grandparents. She took singing lessons with Madame Ronceret (who introduced her to Claude Debussy, with whom she had her first auditions), with Baroness Medem, and with the wife of Louis Fourestier. As a volunteer with the war wounded, she met Yvette Guilbert, also a volunteer, who made her work (hard) on the repertoire of old songs. Her cousin Emmanuel Faÿ (1897-1923), himself an artist and musician, was a friend of Marc Allégret and introduced her to the group of "Nouveaux jeunes" which would soon become The Six. She began her lyrical career by giving small roles in Monteverdi's Il ritorno d'Ulisse in patria, conducted by Vincent d'Indy, and in Hindemith's Hin und zurück, conducted by Madeleine Milhaud.

=== The lyric artist ===
In 1920, her marriage to the heir of the Peignot family opened the doors of the Tout-Paris to her. The Six (Georges Auric, Louis Durey, Arthur Honegger, Darius Milhaud, Francis Poulenc and Germaine Tailleferre) but also Jean Cocteau followed one another at her home, quai Voltaire, Erik Satie, Ricardo Viñes, André Gide, Henri Sauguet, Léon-Paul Fargue, Max Jacob, Roger Désormière and Marcel Herrand. She frequents the Delmas restaurant, the Gaya bar, the Café de la Rotonde, the Salle Huyghens, and Le Bœuf sur le toit, where her husband "multiplies the follies: he wraps himself up in a screen to remove his clothes and, with his chest adorned with a simple tie, has the names of the prettiest women of the evening noted on his bust".

On stage or in the salons of the capital, she defends the music of Georges Auric. (Alphabet, June 5, 1923), Jean Cartan (Trois chants d'été, February 13, 1928), Erik Satie (Socrates, June 20, 1923, at a memorable concert in 1923, where the composer, who was also the accompanist, got carried away in public against Henri Sauguet who had turned the pages on him badly!. She took part in conferences (including that of Darius Milhaud on 23 March 1925), toured in Brussels, sang in Compiègne with Jean Wiéner and Clément Doucet, and was noticed at a concert given at the École normale de musique de Paris:

"Mme Suzanne Peignot had long been classed as one of the most beautiful voices and the best Parisian singers. But until now she was only heard as an amateur. She has just taken the dreaded step. She has just given a Recital at the Salle de l'École normale de musique, in public session. What was to become of it? Was she going to appear to us now that we had the right to be severe, below her worldly reputation? (...) Let us say it at once: the ordeal could not have been more favourable to the beginner. Mme Suzanne Peignot delighted us and, for two hours, held us under the spell of her exquisite voice and the most refined and penetrating interpretation. (...) It is a soprano descending to the mezzo. The interpretation reveals a most subtle sensitivity which is in tune with all the subtleties of the poems and the music, and translates them without preciousness, in the simplest and most spontaneous way."

Her career accelerated: in 1930 she gave a recital at the Théâtre des Champs-Élysées (accompanied by Poulenc). She performed for patrons in Paris, the provinces and abroad. She created the Chansons de la vieille Chine by Pierre Vellones on 19 June 1931. In 1932, in the Conservatoire hall, she performed Cinq poèmes Pierre-Jean Toulet by Pierre-Octave Ferroud and Jet d'eau by Claude Debussy. In 1933, she performed Max Jacob's Four Poems by Vittorio Rieti and performed in the Salle Pleyel on 17 December 1933. On 16 December 1934, salle Gaveau, she gave the premiere of Poulenc's Cinq poèmes de Ronsard. In 1936, she gave a recital at the Musée Grévin. In 1937, she gave the Huit poèmes de Cocteau by Georges Auric.

The critics continue to be laudatory: "Suzanne Peignot has a well timbred voice, even, homogeneous, easy in all registers. Simply, with impeccable articulation, this singer knows how to give to the air of Zaïde's "Dors en paix," "Oiseaux si chaque année" by Mozart, a pure charm and the right accents. Her delicate sensibility allowed her to interpret Ravel's "Histoires naturelles" with poetry and all the desired irony. Interpreter of unpublished works by Nicolas Nabokof, Suzanne Peignot plays with the traps innocently set by the author who writes with a freedom like no other! Francis Poulenc's music, with its delicacy and melodic charm, also suits this sensitive and distinguished artist; her interpretation of the Cinq Poèmes was spiritual and warm. The virtuosos Mehudin and Kreisler. The singer Suzanne The Second World War forced her to leave Paris. In 1940, she took refuge in Cannes with her three children (including the future poet Jérôme Peignot, capable according to her "to tell [his] mother, on her return from the studio, that the B in the Air champêtre was not as good on the radio as at home".) She gave a few concerts there for the benefit of Jewish refugees. She also liked to recall that she had offered there the hospitality of one evening to Emmanuel d'Astier de La Vigerie, who feared being followed by the Gestapo after having pushed a German into the sea. She performed episodically on Paris-Mondial, the radio intended for the colonies, in the night broadcasts, before it was switched off (just after the armistice speech). In 1944, at the British Broadcasting Corporation (BBC), she interpreted Darius Milhaud's Jewish Poems and Benjamin Britten's On this Island. In 1945, she gave Fauré's Le jardin clos and mélodies by Elsa Barraine to Radio-Geneva.

After the war, she still gave a few concerts: at the Embassy in The Hague in 1947; at the Church of Auteuil in honour of the parents of Max Jacob who died in deportation; she created the Six poems of André de Richaud by Henri Sauguet in 1947; she created La petite princesse by Florent Schmitt in 1948; she took part in many radio broadcasts ("Jean Wiéner could phone her in the late evening to ask her to come and sing for him the next morning at seven o'clock on the radio; on arrival at the studio, the composer had not yet written the accompaniment to his melodies: he would then sit down at the piano, play a few chords, spell out one or two arpeggios... and we would record". She encouraged Jacques Leguerney to compose for modern authors, which he did in 1945 by setting to music three poems by Guillaume Apollinaire.

Divorced in 1933, she remarried in 1942 to Henri Laubeuf, engineer and test pilot, with whom she lived until the latter's death in 1952. In 1955, courageously, she was hired by the Gaveau shop in the piano department. One day, without knowing it, Olivier Messiaen "congratulated the house for the competence of the saleswoman, the one he had thanked for having interpreted Le collier and La prière exaucée in 1935"".

She died of natural causes in 1993 in Paris at the age of 97.

François Le Roux and Renaud Machart remembered her in 2013 on France Musique: "She was a woman who, like Louise de Vilmorin, had this mixture of great class and calculated vulgarity".

=== The Quatuor vocal Suzanne Peignot ===
In 1932, she created the Quatuor vocal Suzanne Peignot, with Germaine Cossini (contralto), Paula Fizsel (mezzo) and Suzanne Rouffilange (soprano). Conrad Beck, Pierre-Octave Ferroud, Darius Milhaud and Pierre Vellones wrote for them.

=== Francis Poulenc's muse ===
From 1917 until his death in 1963, Rivière-Peignot maintained a deep friendship with Poulenc, who admired her talent: "She sings the Airs champêtres better than anyone else", he said in substance; he wrote again: "I composed the Airs chantés, the Poèmes de Rossard, those of Louis Lalanne for Suzanne Peignot. I don't know of a more sensitive interpreter. She is a born musician." He dedicated four airs to her: Airs champêtres (on a text by Jean Moréas, Attributes (on a poem by Pierre de Ronsard), La petite servante (on a poem by Max Jacob), and Il vole (on a poem by Louise de Vilmorin). She created and recorded the Airs chantés with the composer at the piano in 1966.

Poulenc's proverbial lack of enthusiasm for making his music work did not prevent complicity: "When they had not achieved a satisfactory result, he would only say to her, in the nasal and straightforward manner that characterised him: "You sang like a pig. Come on, let's do it again!".

Their relationship was as intimate as it is shared: "My treasure," he wrote to her in 1934. You are to me what you tell me I am to you and you are exactly the only "person in the world who makes me feel like a sister". I always open your letters with joy and it is with much more joy that I await your arrival on the road." For her part, she confided: For me, Francis was even more than a brother; he was an incomparable friend and a light that guided me throughout my career. His judgments about music were always brilliant and accurate. Working with him was an exciting and rich experience."

In 1961, the two were almost killed in a violent car accident on the way to Auric's house, from which they escaped unharmed; she reported that he confided to her that he almost wished he had "died like that, a brutal death, without noticing it".

== Recordings ==
- Airs chantés, by Francis Poulenc, Paris : Pathé Marconi [DL 1966]
