= Resistance Medal =

French military decoration

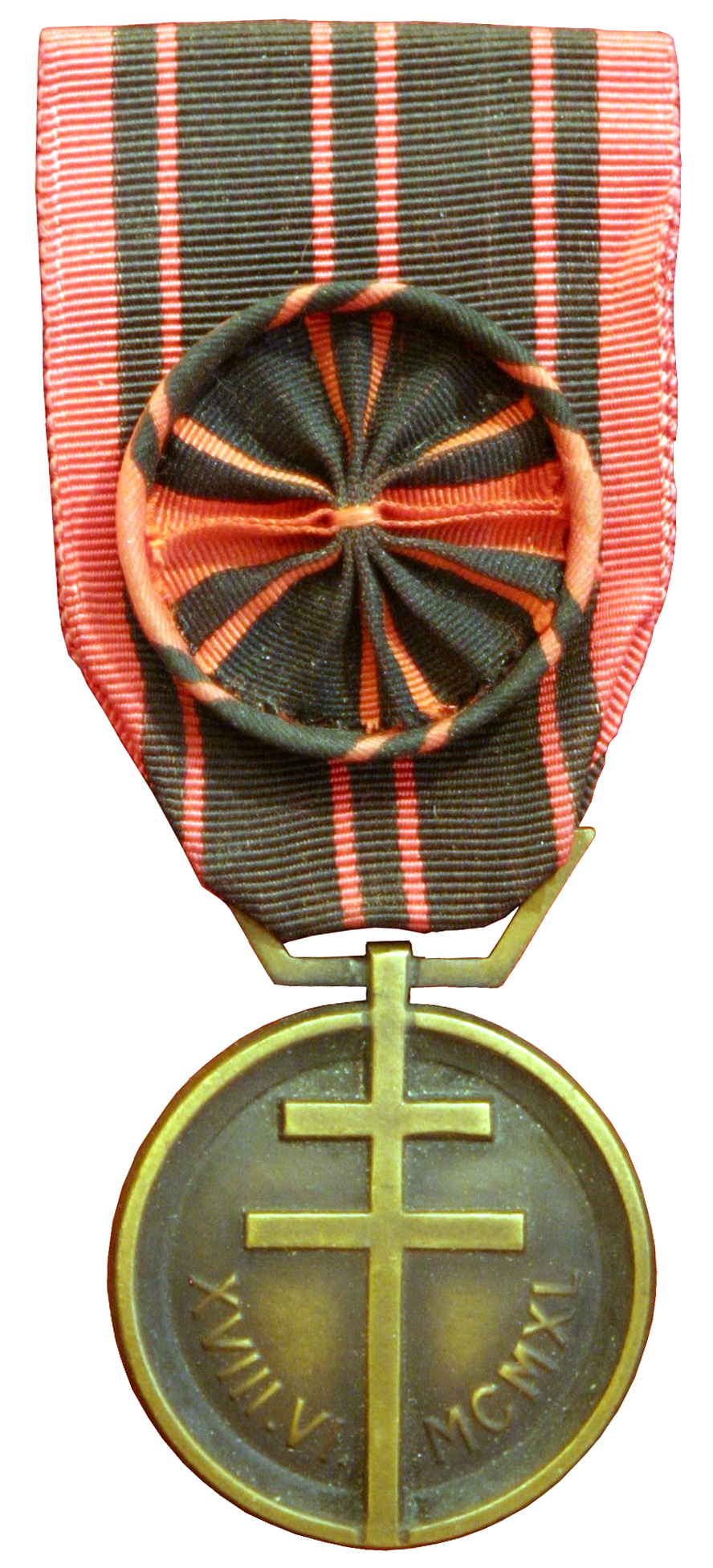
- The Resistance medal with rosette (obverse). The red stripes in this sample have faded to a lighter color due to the passage of time.
- Type: Decoration
- Awarded for: Remarkable acts of courage that contributed to the resistance of the French people against the enemy
- Presented by: France
- Status: No longer awarded
- Established: 9 February 1943
- Final award: 31 March 1947

Highlights
- Total awarded posthumously: 24,463
- Total recipients: 62,000
- Ribbons of the Resistance medal with and without rosette

Precedence
- Next (higher): Medal for the War Wounded
- Next (lower): Ordre des Palmes Académiques

The Resistance Medal (French: Médaille de la Résistance, pronounced [medaj də la ʁezistɑ̃s]) was a decoration bestowed by the French Committee of National Liberation, based in the United Kingdom, during World War II. It was established by a decree of General Charles de Gaulle on 9 February 1943 "to recognize the remarkable acts of faith and of courage that, in France, in the empire and abroad, have contributed to the resistance of the French people against the enemy and against its accomplices since 18 June 1940".

The Resistance medal was awarded to approximately 38,288 living persons and 24,463 posthumously. These awards were both for membership in the Free French forces and for participation in the metropolitan clandestine Resistance during the German occupation of France in World War II. Higher deeds were rewarded with the Ordre de la Libération. Proposals for the medal ceased to be accepted on 31 March 1947. For acts that occurred in Indochina, however, that date was moved back to 31 December 1947.

The medal was also awarded to 18 communities and territories, 21 military units, and to 15 other organizations including convents, high schools, and hospitals that particularly distinguished themselves.

== Award statute ==
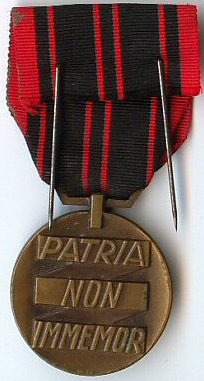
Reverse of the Resistance medal

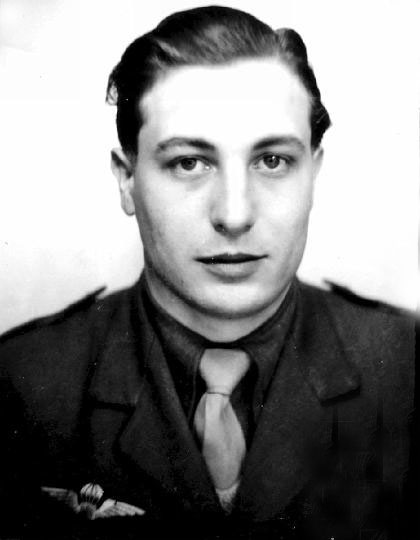
Free French Officer and OSS Agent René Joyeuse, a recipient of the Resistance medal with rosette

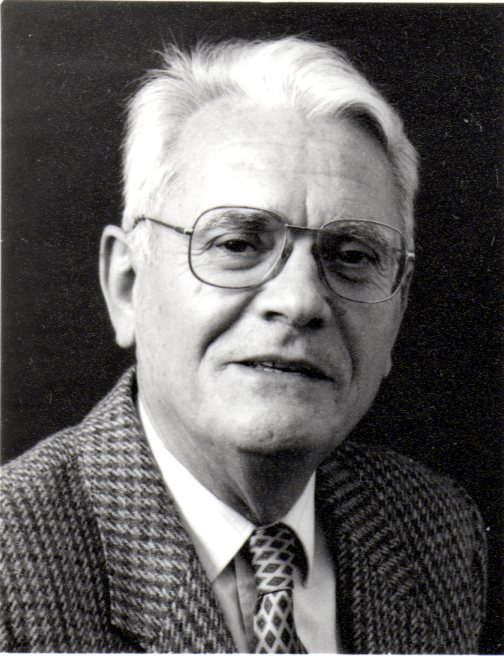
Resistance member Léo Figuères, a recipient of the Resistance medal

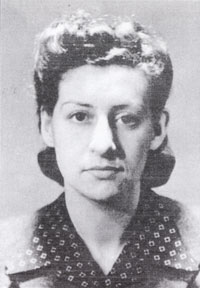
Resistance member Denise Bloch, a posthumous recipient of the Resistance medal

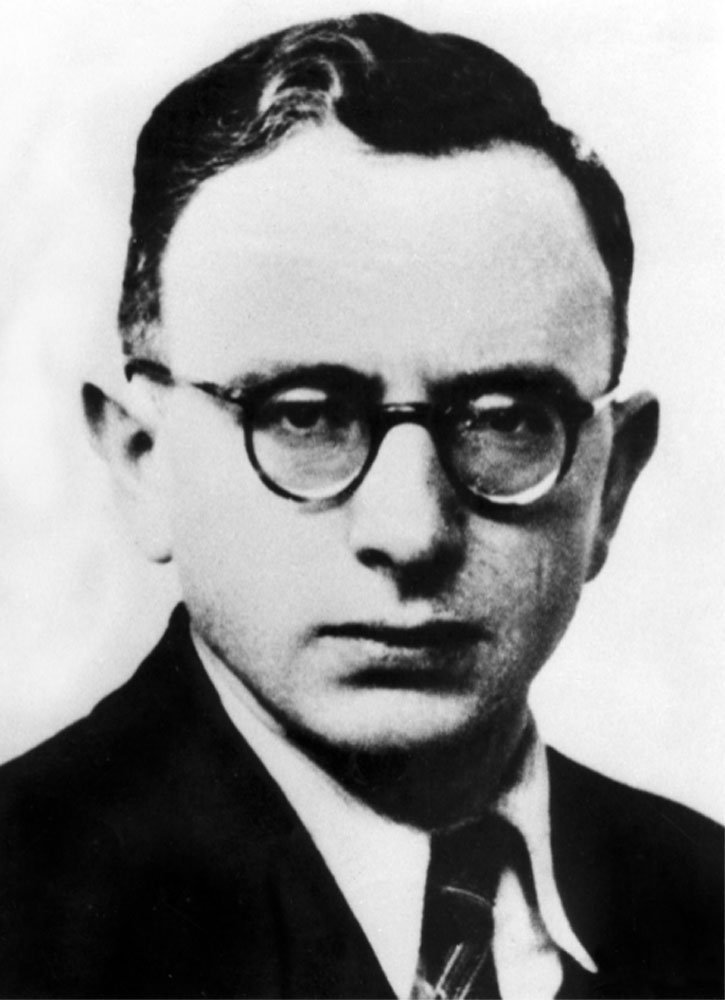
Resistance leader Pierre Kaan, posthumous recipient of the Resistance medal

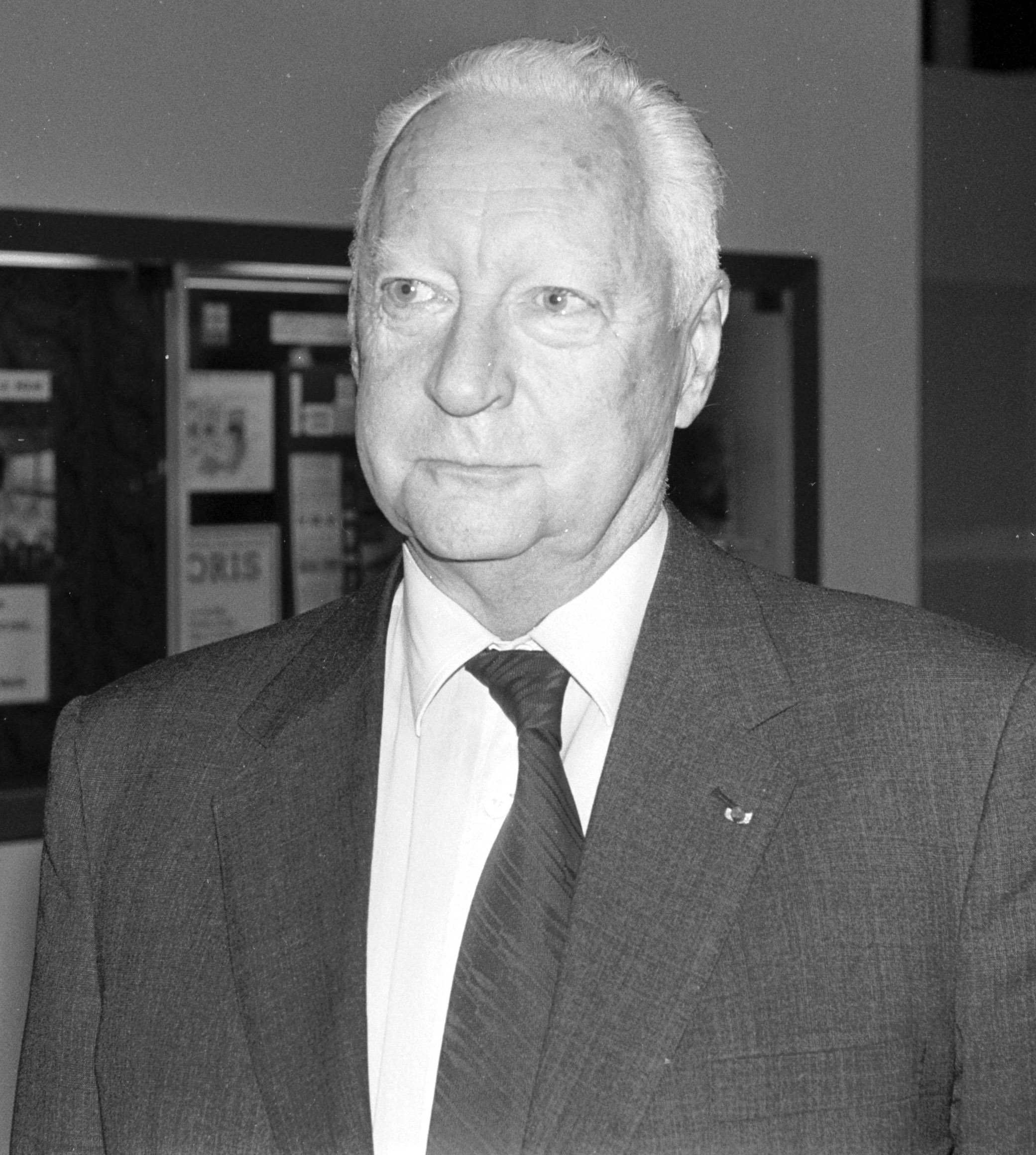
Free French soldier and politician Pierre Messmer, a recipient of the Resistance medal

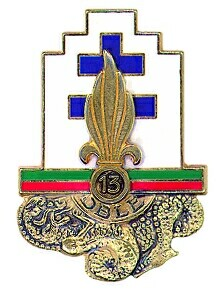
Insignia of the 13th Demi-Brigade of the Foreign Legion, a recipient unit of the Resistance medal

Coat of arms of the Brest commune, a recipient community of the Resistance medal

The Resistance medal was awarded by the Chief of a Fighting France to French, and rarely non-French, individuals and communities:

- who took an especially active part since 18 June 1940 in the resistance against Axis forces and their accomplices on French soil or in a territory under French sovereignty;
- who took an effective and important part in the rallying of French territories to Fighting France or rendered services in the war effort of those territories that were confirmed and logged;
- who played an eminent role in the actions of organizations of Fighting France abroad or in propaganda destined at regrouping and supporting the forces of the resistance;
- who rallied troops, ships or aircraft in exceptionally difficult or dangerous conditions;
- who joined the Free French Forces in particularly dangerous and meritorious conditions.

The Resistance medal may be revoked by decree following any act contrary to honour or integrity, whether committed prior to or after bestowal of the medal.

== Award description ==
The Resistance medal is a 37mm in diameter circular medal struck from bronze. Its slightly concave obverse bears at center a vertical Cross of Lorraine with the relief semi circular inscription of the date of General de Gaulle's appeal of 18 June 1940 in Roman numerals "XVIII.VI.MCMXL" (18.06.1940) bisected by the lower part of the cross. The reverse bears the relief image of an unfurling ribbon bearing the relief inscription in Latin "PATRIA NON IMMEMOR" translating into "THE NATION DOES NOT FORGET". The suspension is cast as an integral part of the medal.

The medal hangs from a 36mm wide black silk moiré ribbon with six vertical red stripes of varying widths, 3mm wide edge stripes, two 1mm wide central stripes 2mm apart, and two 1mm wide stripes 6mm from the central stripes. A 28mm in diameter rosette is on the ribbon of the Officer of the Resistance medal.

== Notable recipients (partial list) ==
- Resistance leader Jean Pierre-Bloch
- Resistance member Josephine Baker
- Resistance leader and air force pilot Claudius Billon
- Resistance member Pierre Baruzy
- Resistance member Madeleine Dreyfus
- Resistance member Albert Haar
- Resistance member Andrzej Kuśniewicz
- Resistance member Georges Caussanel
- Resistance member Jane Vialle
- Resistance member and imam Si Kaddour Benghabrit
- Resistance member lieutenant Henry Andraud
- Resistance member Marcel Dufriche
- Resistance member Édouard Le Jeune, former Senator
- Resistance leader Colonel Émile Coulaudon
- Resistance leader Capitaine Adrien Pommier
- SOE Operative and First Aid Nursing Yeomanry member Nancy Wake
- Admiral Philippe Auboyneau
- Resistance movement founder, army lieutenant, businessman and politician Antoine Avinin
- Lieutenant General Marcel Bigeard
- Foreign Legion general Bernard Saint-Hillier
- Foreign Legion Lieutenant Colonel Pierre Jeanpierre
- French paratrooper André Zirnheld (The Paratrooper's Prayer)
- Writer, statesman, resistance member André Malraux
- Resistance member, union leader, SOE operative and politician Yvon Morandat
- Writer, statesman, resistance member Paul Rassinier
- Irish playwright, director, novelist Samuel Beckett
- Irish language teacher and resistance worker Janie McCarthy
- Resistance leader Pierre Kahn-Farelle
- Politician, resistance member general Pierre de Bénouville
- Resistance member doctor Charles Cliquet
- Resistance member Jeanne L'Herminier
- Resistance member sous-lieutenant Marina Vega (Base Espagne)
- Free French soldier general François Binoche
- Resistance Leader Camille Nicolas
- Free French Forces and Office of Strategic Services Captain René Joyeuse
- Diplomat Louis Alexis Étienne Bonvin
- Resistance member Émile Bollaert
- Resistance leader Edmond Proust
- Free French soldier warrant officer Walter Grand
- Resistance leader Joseph Dubar
- Free French navy admiral Georges Thierry d'Argenlieu
- Resistance member, captain in the French military, French art historian and "Monuments Men" member Rose Valland
- Resistance leader and general practitioner, André Vansteenberghe
- Resistance member, general practitioner, torture victim of and prosecution witness against Klaus Barbie, Alice Vansteenberghe
- Resistance proeminent organiser in Marseille, Jacques Baumel

== Notable posthumous recipients (partial list) ==
- Grenoble resistance member Jean Pain
- Free French aviator lieutenant Gérard Claron
- Free French aviator captain Louis Flury-Hérard
- Resistance leader general Aubert Frère
- Captain, doctor, mayor of Saint-Rambert-en-Bugey, Michel Temporal
- Resistance member Pierre Guillou
- Free French aviator Pierre Brisdoux Galloni d'Istria
- Resistance leader Fernand Zalkinow
- Resistance member colonel Émile Bonotaux
- Resistance member brigadier general Georges Journois
- Abbot René Bonpain
- Resistance leader Pierre Brossolette
- Resistance leader Pierre Kaan
- Resistance member Léger Fouris
- Resistance member Gabriel Plançon
- Resistance member rabbi Samuel Klein
- Resistance member Laurent Matheron
- Resistance leader Marc Haguenau
- Resistance member Georges Lamarque
- Resistance leader rear admiral Jacques Trolley de Prévaux
- Resistance member Jean Chaffanjon
- Resistance member Pierre Chaffanjon
- Resistance member Yvonne Chollet
- Resistance member Robert Duterque
- Resistance member Henri Fertet (1926-1943)
- Resistance member, chemist France Bloch-Sérazin (1913 – 1943)
- Resistance member Agnès de La Barre de Nanteuil (1922–1944)
- Sébastienne Guyot (1896–1941), engineer, olympic athlete, died as a result of treatment in prison after attempting to rescue brother from detention camp.

== Recipient communities and organizations (partial list) ==
- Oyonnax commune
- University of Strasbourg
- Montceau-les-Mines commune
- Lalande de Bourg-en-Bresse high school
- 6th Engineers Regiment
- Preparatory Military School of Autun
- Marsoulas commune
- Caniac-du-Causse commune
- Miribel commune
- Béthincourt commune
- Meximieux commune
- 1st Line Infantry Regiment
- Terrou commune
- Nantua commune
- Notre-Dame de Timadeuc abbey
- French submarine Le Glorieux
- French submarine Surcouf
- 13th Demi-Brigade of the Foreign Legion
- 1st Marines Regiment
- City of Brest
- Caen commune

== See also ==
- Free French Forces
- French Resistance
- Milice
- Liberation of France
- Maquis
