= Lucien Laurat =

Austrian author (1898–1973)

Otto Maschl (1898–1973), better known as Lucien Laurat, was an Austrian Marxist and author, mostly known in the English-speaking world for his book Marxism and Democracy. He was part of the Anti-Stalinist left.

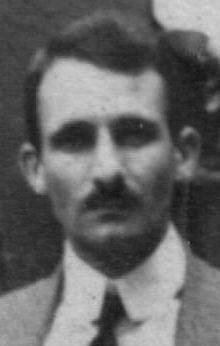
Photo of Lucien Laurat from 1921

In Marxism and Democracy Laurat provides an examination into the views of Rosa Luxemburg and her critique of Leninism. He examines the way she describes the changing roles of governing forces away from simply imposing their will to maintain power to a system of enlightening the masses and becoming a function of their collective or a major portion of their collective wills. Laurat was one of the first to argue that Soviet society was neither capitalist nor socialist, but a bureaucratic oligarchy (see Nomenklatura).

== Publications ==
- Marxism and Democracy, London, 1940
- Staline: La linguistique et l'impérialisme Russe [Stalin: Linguistics and Russian Imperialism], Paris: Les Îles d'Or, 1951
- Le drame économique et monétaire français depuis la libération, with Marcelle Pommera, Paris: Les Îles d'Or, Paris, 1953
