= Georges Peignot =

French type designer, type foundry and business owner

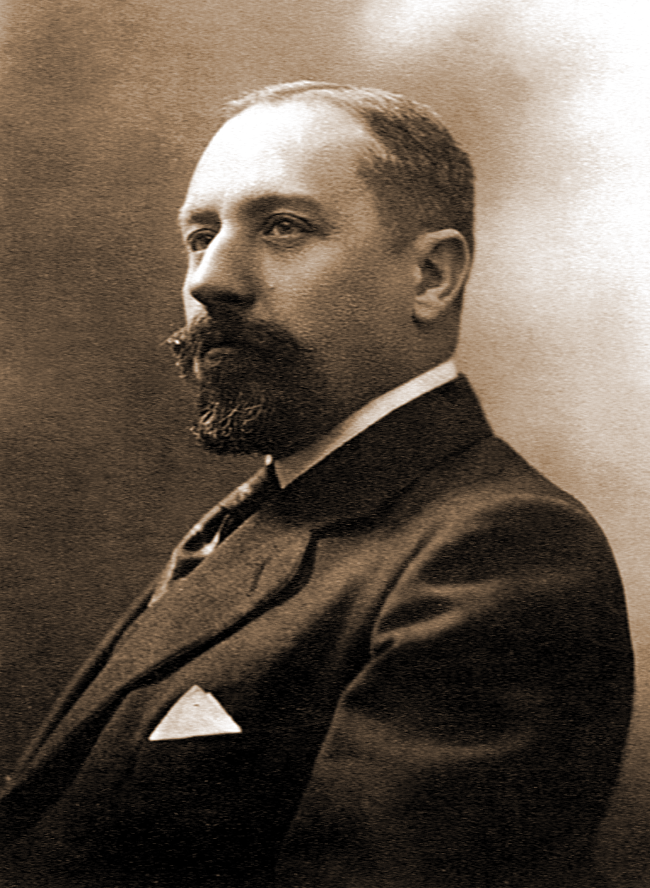
- Georges Peignot, age 38
- Born: Georges Louis Jean Baptiste Peignot; 24 June 1872; Paris, France
- Died: 28 September 1915 (aged 43); Givenchy, France
- Occupations: Type designer, type founder, manager of the G. Peignot et Fils foundry
- Years active: 1896–1915
- Known for: Grasset, Cochin, Auriol, Garamont typefaces

Georges Louis Jean Baptiste Peignot (French: [ʒɔʁʒ pɛɲo]; 24 June 1872, Paris – 28 September 1915, Givenchy-en-Gohelle) was a French type designer, type founder, and businessman who managed the G. Peignot & Fils foundry until his death in combat during World War I. The father of four children (including poet Colette Peignot, under her alias Laure), under his leadership the G. Peignot & Fils foundry became one of the most well-known and remarkable French typography houses of the twentieth century (an "elite house", according to a former French Prime Minister): over 17 years, he created or launched several prestigious fonts, including Grasset, Cochin, and Garamont.

== Early years ==
Born in 1872, Georges Peignot was the fourth child of eight. His father, Gustave Peignot (1839–1899), an engineer who had graduated from the prestigious engineering institute now known as Arts et Métiers ParisTech, was the head of a fixed spaces foundry in Paris that specialized in the fabrication of hand-set metal type to achieve letter-spacing. It was created in 1842 by Pierre Leclerc and bought and directed by his mother, Clémentine Dupont de Vieux Pont (1815–1897), the widow of Laurent Peignot.

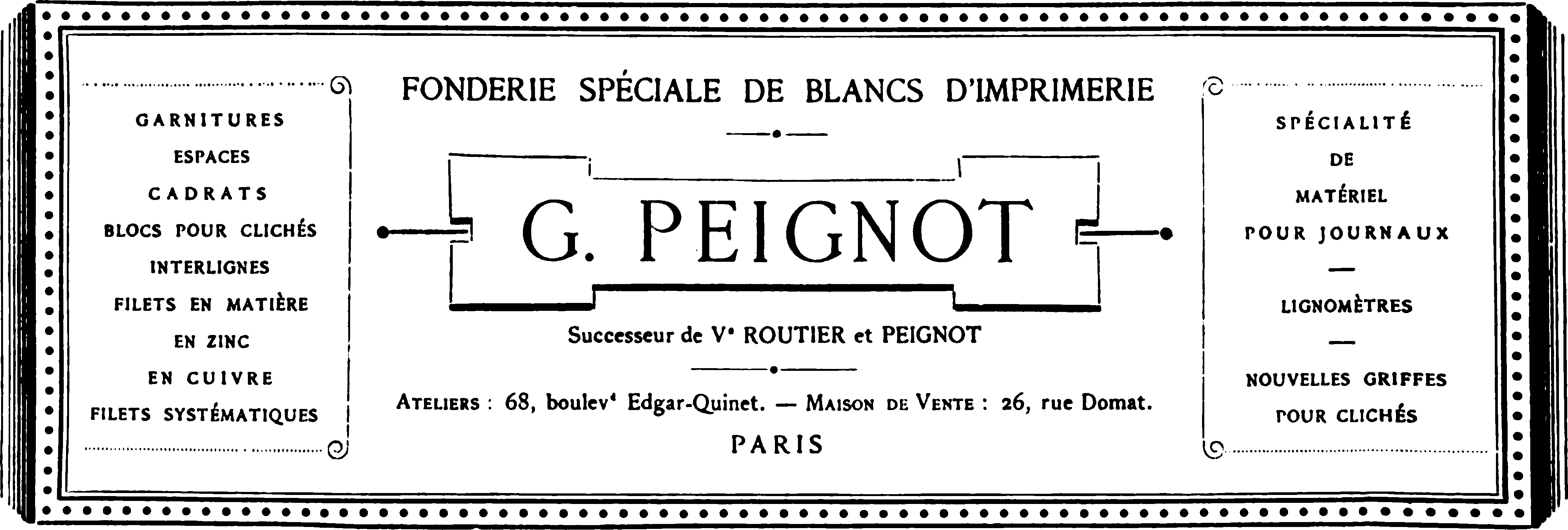
Advertisement for Gustave Peignot's foundry published in L'imprimerie magazine, in 1883

Georges Peignot attended the Chaptal College in Paris, but left without a qualification. Following this, he undertook an apprenticeship with his godfather, Émile Faconnet, master intaglio printer. Faconnet, an engraver, was a close friend of Marie Laporte-Peignot's parents. Marie would become the wife of Gustave Peignot and the mother of Georges and Faconnet would become Georges' godfather. A portrait of Marie Laporte-Peignot, as a girl, was painted by Auguste Renoir. It may be seen at Limoges museum, and belongs to Renoir's family.

In 1890, Georges was admitted to École nationale supérieure des arts décoratifs an "Arts Déco" school. In 1891, he moved to Germany, first in Leipzig in the Schwinger foundry where he discovered the world of printing and learned punchcutting. In 1892, he was in Hamburg in the Gentzsch foundry where, with the son of that family, who was of the same age, he toured the services and workshops. His passion about type continued and he passed all his spare time admiring international typographic catalogs.

Back in France in 1893, Georges Peignot spent two and a half years in military service, where he was graduated as sergeant, the highest rank for those who do not have the baccalaureate. In 1896, he married Suzanne Chardon, daughter of a master intaglio printer in charge of chalcography for the Louvre, whose workshops still may be seen at 10 rue de l'Abbaye, in Paris (courtyard). They had four children (Charles, 1897; Madeleine, 1899; Geneviève, 1900; Colette, 1903).

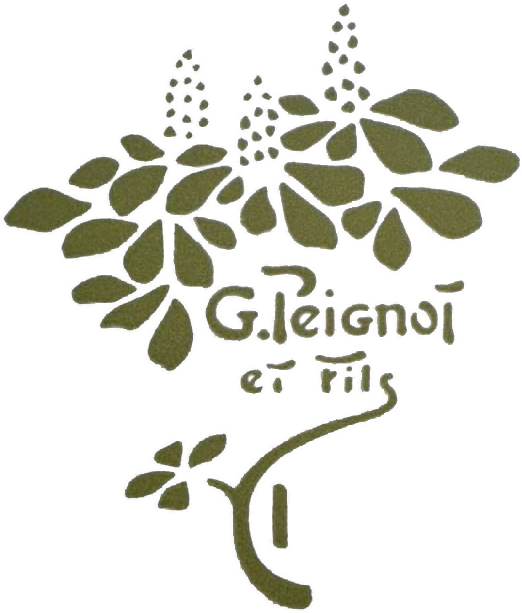
Logo for the new G. Peignot et Fils foundry that Georges Peignot would manage for 17 years, until his death

In 1896, he was hired to work in his father's "G. Peignot" foundry. Georges Peignot was responsible for the management of recently acquired types (G. Peignot et Fils had absorbed Cochard & David foundry and Longien foundry) and possibly, for creating new fonts. In 1898, his father, became ill and transformed the company into a Kommanditgesellschaft on behalf of "G. Peignot et Fils" and distributed the shares to his eight children. He had time to appoint Georges co-manager before dying the following year. In 1899, Georges Peignot officially became sole manager of the company. Board members were Robert Peignot, eldest son, engineer in charge of manufacturing, Georges Peignot, and Charles Tuleu, husband of Jane Peignot, the eldest daughter, and the owner of the rival foundry Deberny. In 1906, Paul Payet, husband of Julia Peignot, the second daughter and close ally of Gustave Peignot's widow, top executive in a railways company, joined the board on the instruction of the widow.

== Grasset (1898) ==
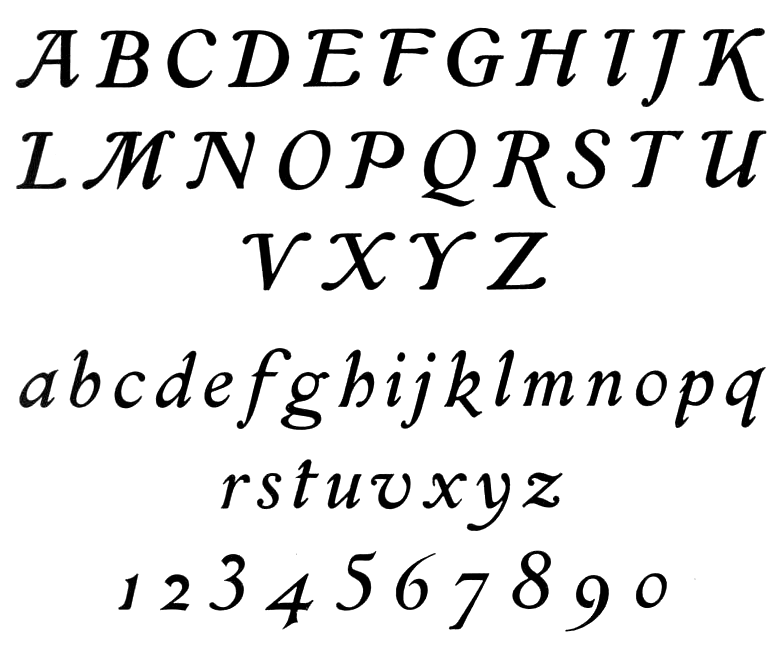
Grasset italic (1898), created by Eugène Grasset

In 1897, as a young industrialist aged 25, Georges Peignot met Eugène Grasset already famous in the Art Nouveau world for his furniture, posters, stamps, titles and patterns of books, textiles, printed wallpapers, and other items. Grasset had freely adapted to the alphabet of Nicolas Jenson (1471) with the intention of using it to print a book on his own method for ornamental composition that was inspired by the courses he gave to the Guérin school. With his father's agreement, Georges Peignot acquired Grasset's alphabet, got an official patent on October 7, 1897, for the typeface under the name "Grasset", and gave Henri Parmentier, the workshop's punchcutter, the mission to engrave it. For harmonious compositions, he decided to offer thirteen sizes of the same type, and « for the first time in a French workshop, the scale of sizes of a character [was] created by photographic reductions of a genuine drawing », according to Thibaudeau^{,}.

In the fall of 1898 a medieval novel, Les aventures merveilleuses de Huon de Bordeaux, chanson de geste, was published in Grasset, chosen because the Middle Ages are the favorite epoch of Art Nouveau subjects. The world of typography was alerted and revealed very supportive. In 1900, only seven sizes were punched, but orders arrived for other sizes. Georges Peignot and Francis Thibaudeau, a high-quality master typographer he had hired, created a small catalog, that was discreet, but very tasteful. After sending the catalog to all important printers, the orders poured into the company, and compliments from specialized press and art connoisseurs were garnered. In the courtyard of the Boulevard de Montrouge (later renamed "boulevard Edgar-Quinet") where they settled for 34 years, the Peignot workshops suddenly became insufficient. The company had to move to the corner of Cabanis and Ferrus streets (XIV^{th} arrondissement) in Paris, and the new plant opened in 1904.

The success earned Georges Peignot, 29, the recognition of his peers and he became treasurer of the Chambre syndicale (typographic trade association). His own work was also copied: in June 1902 the justice seized forged types of Renault foundry and the two foundries went to court. Surprisingly, the infringement case was lost in 1905 and the company G. Peignot & Fils had to pay the costs for having accused the Renault foundry, which asserted that their work had been inspired by a Gryphe work, a Lyon publisher of the sixteenth century amateur, Jenson, whose work was in the public domain and could be copied. The judges had no sensitivity to the particular drawing of the reed and other specific qualities of Grasset.

Two of Georges Peignot's brothers, Robert (engineer of Arts et Métiers) and Lucien (engineer of the École centrale), sailed to the United States where they knew they could find the most modern automatic typographic machines.

== Auriol and other fonts (1902) ==
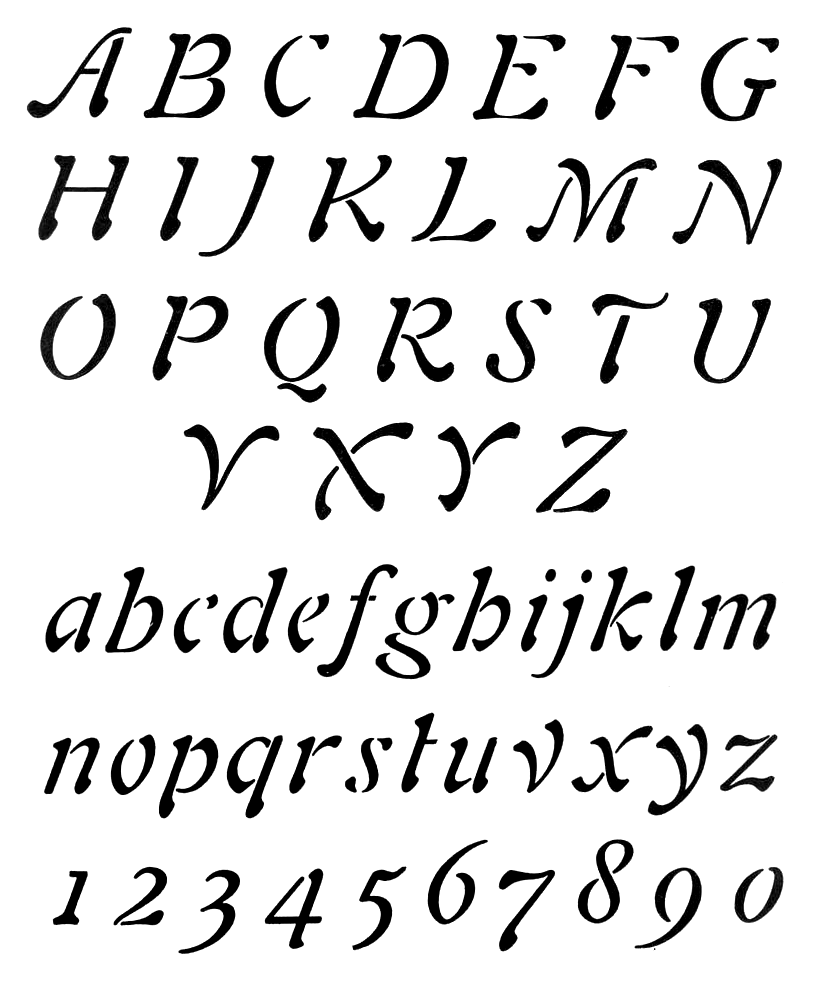
Auriol italic (1904), created by George Auriol

In 1898, Georges Peignot created an Art Nouveau typeface for George Auriol (aka Georges Huyot), a gifted singer-poet-painter. A year later, Auriol proposed to use it for "la Française-légère". Georges Peignot accepted the order on 11 October 1899, and launched the punchcutting despite family's opposition. In 1902 the complete alphabet was available in five sizes. Success was around the corner again, but the career of the new typeface was not so productive as Grasset: Française-légère is a display typeface, unlike Didot or Garamond devoted to serious works, and it's intended for short texts, advertising, subtitles, etc. Therefore, the use was not so frequent, nor the replacement of lead fonts: for a foundry, it was not a good deal.

During the following years display-type production was still privileged: Georges Peignot's foundry launched "l’Auriol Labeur " (Auriol book, 1904), "Française-allongée" (1905), "Auriol Champlevé" (1906), the series of eight "Robur" typefaces (black, pale, striped, clair-de-lune, etc., 1907). Promoting these "fancy" characters, Georges Peignot played with the classic structure of the letter (unchanged since the fifteenth century), and ran the risk that its customers would sacrifice readability for the beauty of its characters, which were very "Art Nouveau". He advocated for a "Typography", which meant – for him – that a typeface comes with many sizes, italics, vignettes, and ornaments. Sort of typographic philosophy, now described as a family.

In the continuity, the foundry launched a series of ornaments and vignettes for the Grasset typeface. The creations of George Auriol were also enshrined in two series of « creepers, flowers, flames » that Francis Thibaudeau laid out in two booklets (Vignettes Art Français et Ornements français, 31 pages to be published again in the Spécimen général few months after). G. Peignot et Fils also released a booklet entitled, Album d’application des nouvelles créations françaises (Catalog for applications of new French creations, 1901), a pamphlet written by Francis Thibaudeau in favor of Art Nouveau.

== Publication of the Spécimen (1903) ==
Only after having launched "Grasset" (thirteen sizes) and "Française-légère" (five sizes), Georges Peignot decided to publish a Spécimen and thereby benefit from the enormous success of its new characters. All the fonts created or acquired by the G. Peignot & Fils foundry were available in it.

The Spécimen consists of two volumes of 450 and 200 pages (the first appears at the end of July 1903, the second in 1906). The layout is generous: seven chapter headings in four colors, airy presentation of each typeface or ornament, often in two colors, with variation of different sizes, are funny or informative sentences. Beneath their aesthetic success, the two volumes also were useful: all the technical details that can be used in a printshop were clearly set out in tables, lists, diagrams: return rates and prizes of old fonts, sizes of various folded formats, instructions on cutting lines, etc. The text is serious and didactic: the last chapter is written by Francis Thibaudeau, who painted a retrospective of typography and its scenery, from the Renaissance to present day.

== Cochin (1912) ==
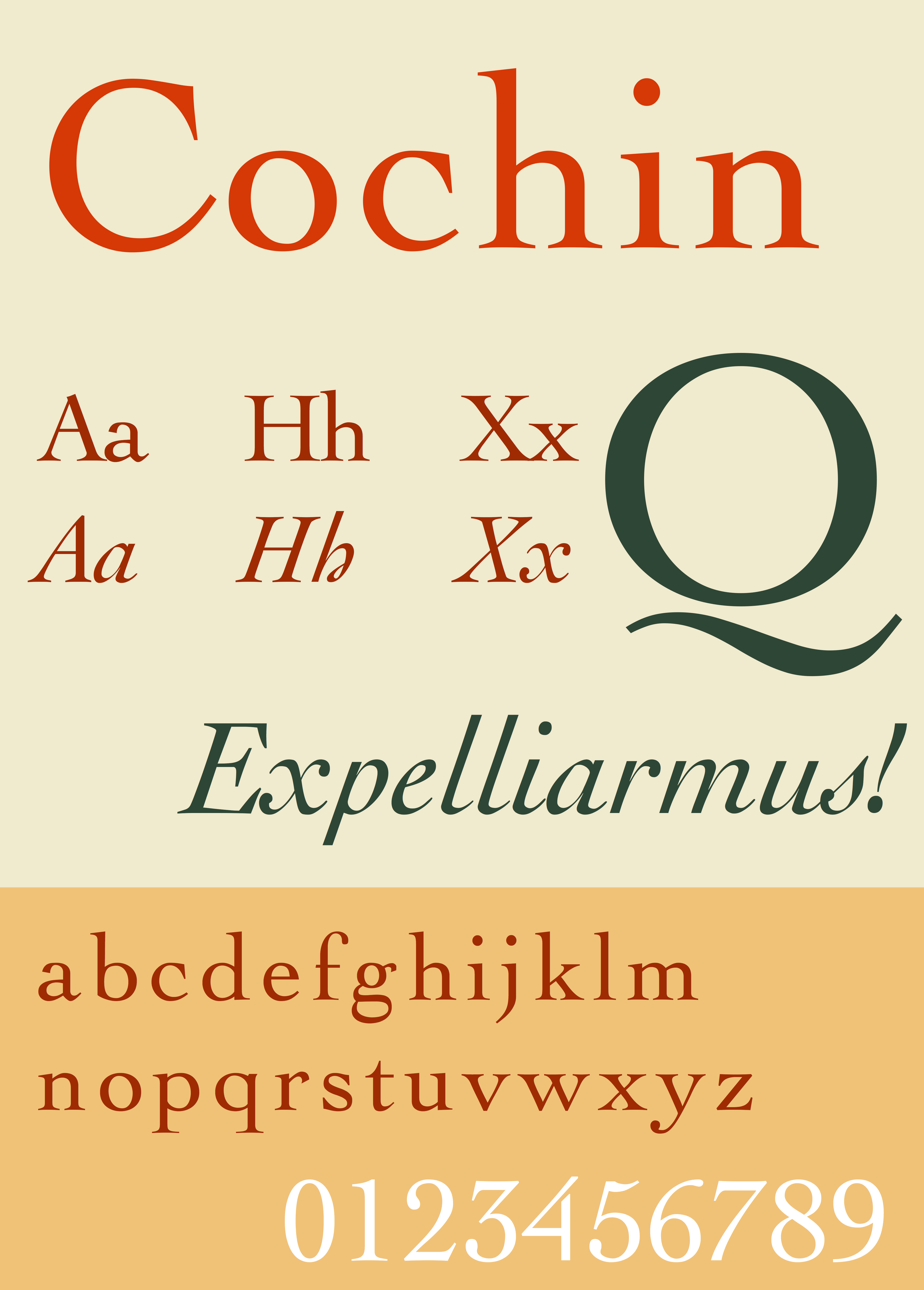
Cochin (1912), created by Georges Peignot

Because the market for Grasset was slowing, Georges Peignot sought a new text-dedicated typeface. In 1910, he launched the "Bellery-Desfontaines", an upscale fantasy character in rupture with Art nouveau style: any vegetal form was excluded.

Georges Peignot found inspiration in the engravings of the eighteenth century: supported by Lucien Peignot, his younger brother who became co-manager and a close friend, and by Francis Thibaudeau, his typography master, he noticed that the writers of this time rejected the solemn style of founders such as Louis-René Luce, Fournier, Didot and preferred to engrave the text accompanying their illustrations themselves. Georges Peignot was impassioned by the work of the writer and illustrator of Menus-Plaisirs du roi, Cochin. He then proposed a new typeface, inspired by a design found in the archives (still anonymous today), gave it the name "Cochin" and submitted it in October 1912. That was not all. He proposed a complete typeface suite, 2000 punches (in January 1914), composed of a "Nicolas-Cochin" stretched to the poles, a "Moreau-le-jeune" champlevé, and a 200 years old fantasy typeface, "Fournier-le-jeune". Last but not least, adequate decorations and decorated letters were entrusted to Pierre Roy and André-Édouard Marty, illustrators to La Gazette du Bon Ton.

In 1912, the Cochin suite was launched on the market in two different ways: the first coup recalled the publication of the medieval book for Grasset and consisted, before marketing the lead fonts, to compose in Cochin a new fashion magazine: La Gazette du Bon Ton (launched by Lucien Vogel of Vogue, the Jardin des modes, etc.). The success was great, not only because of Cochin only, but also because the magazine was beyond anything, seen in terms of taste, quality of illustrations (mostly watercolors), and discovery of new trends, etc. The second and most important promotional vehicle of Cochin was a high typographic quality booklet, published 18 January 1914, and sent to all Paris, including typographers, printers, artists, and journalists. The trio composed of Georges Peignot, Lucien Peignot, and Francis Thibaudeau had time to polish up their weapons of seduction: it took two years for cutting 62 alphabets, plus ornaments and vignettes. The result, as it was possible to admire it, was in the booklet, and the booklet itself: pink and gold cover, white and mid-tone laid paper, black, gold, and color printing, examples or bilboquets on full pages, precious illustrations by the use of Roy and Marty vignettes. The text too, written by Lucien Peignot, was of excellent literary outfit.

== Garamont (1912) ==
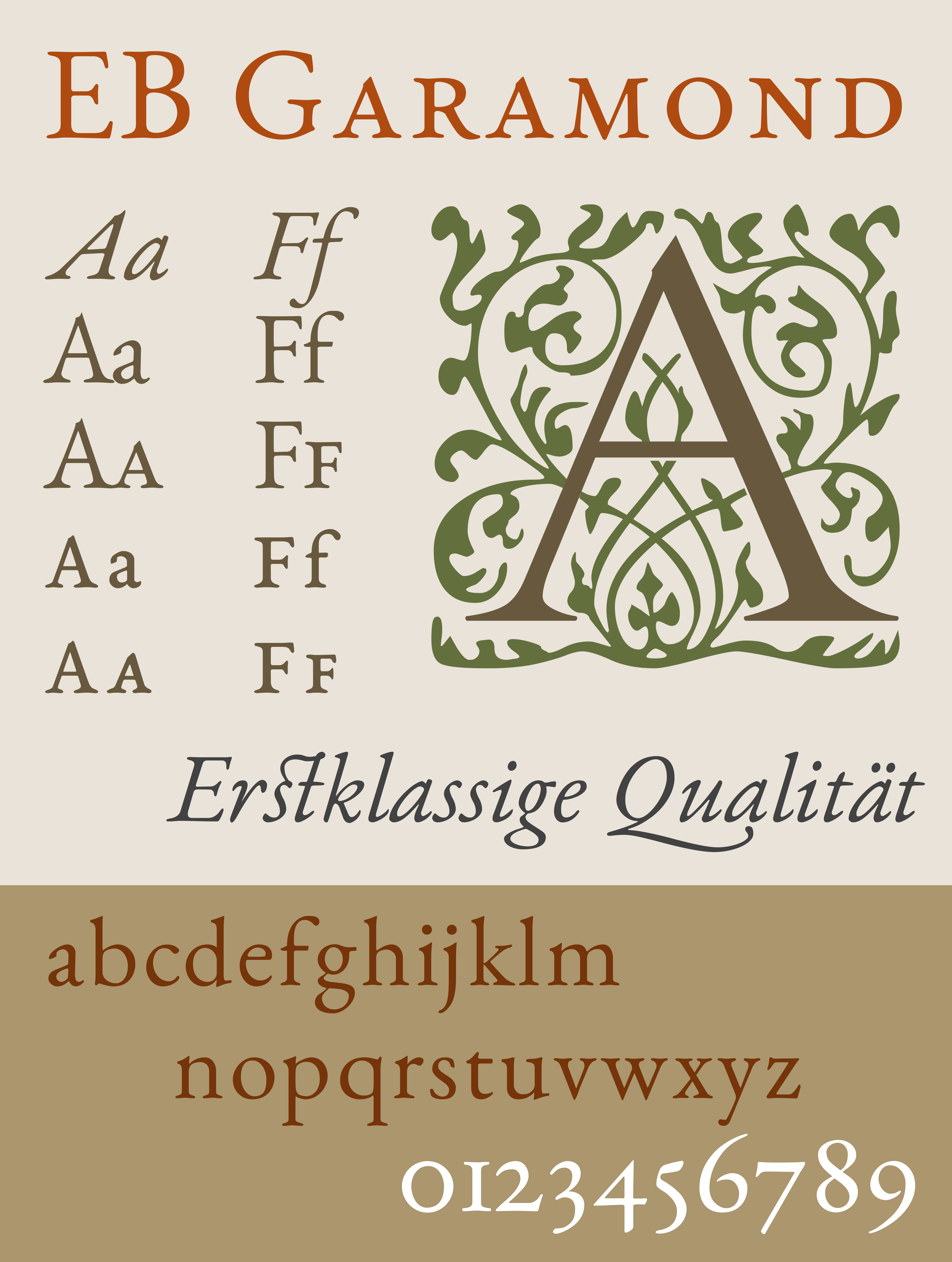
Garamont (1912), created by Georges Peignot

Thanks to Cochin suite and to some very profitable and recent acquisitions (thus the "Didot" from the Beaudoire foundry), the profits of the company G. Peignot & Fils rose to unforeseen heights. Unfortunately, Georges Peignot did not benefit because he was put in minority within the company's board after a maneuver of his own mother (who thereby expressed his hostility to the unloved son and his preference for his two eldest, Jane and Robert, that her husband had had previously excluded from company's decisions). Added to the personal attacks within his family, Georges Peignot has had also serious concern caused by constant improvements of automatic typographic machines he intended danger since 1905. Rejected, depressed, Georges Peignot stepped back from the daily management of the company and confided it to his younger Lucien Peignot.

He was dedicated to the launch of a new font. He had noticed that the Garamond typeface of the sixteenth century was created for printing on thick, cotton-based paper, in which the characters sank, leaving a greasy track. The same typeface used on a wood-based paper seemed thin. His idea was to re-draw the character with the original bold effect found on rag paper. He started manufacturing a new Garamont (sic) typeface with the help of engraver Henri Parmentier. The result was presented and marketed in 1926, 11 years after his death.

Meanwhile, in 1910, Georges Peignot commissioned the engraver Bernard Naudin for a new typeface in roman, italics and champlevé; the typeface is recorded in 1912 and 1913; but it will be placed on the market in 1924, without much success.

== War, sacrifice, death (1915) ==
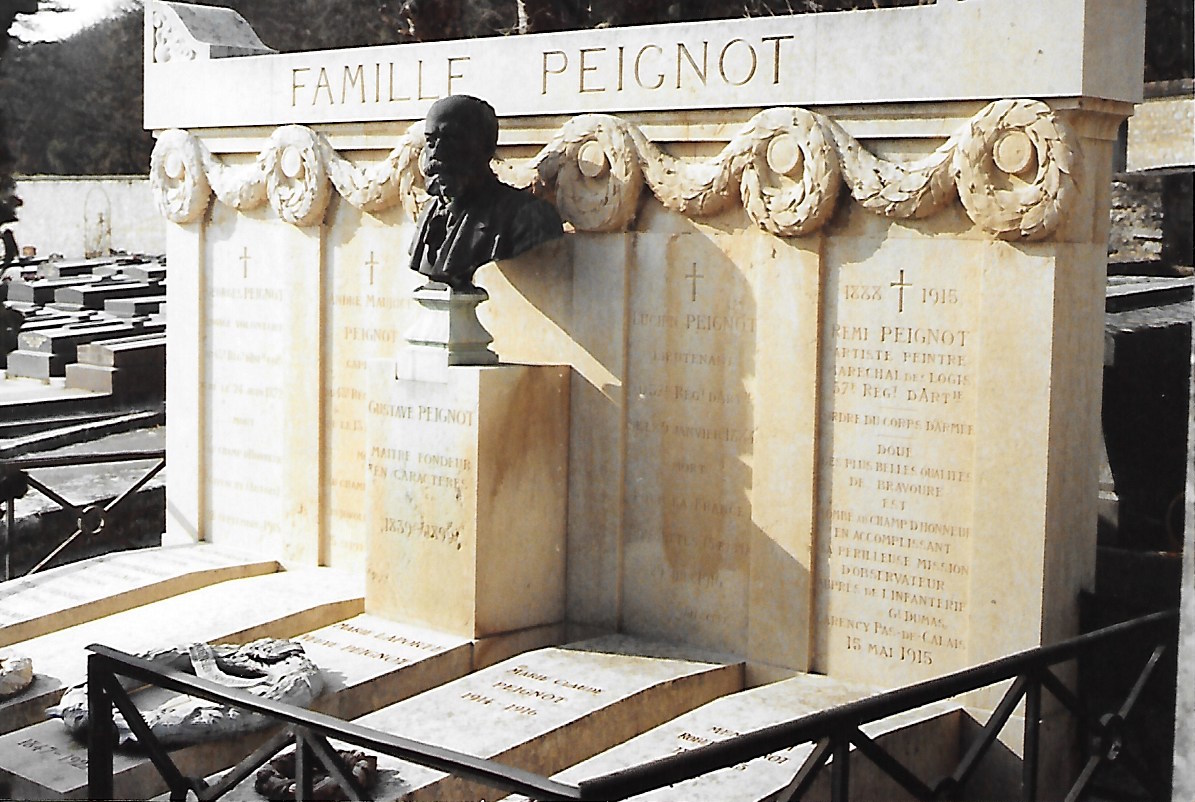
Tomb of Georges Peignot at the Fontainebleau cemetery

When World War was declared, Georges was mobilized as adjutant of artillery of the Territorial army (composed of men aged 34–49 years, considered too old and not enough trained to integrate an active frontline regiment nor reserve). He was assigned to the 23rd Battery of the 1st Artillery Regiment and stationed at Fort Cormeilles. On 25 September 1914, his closest younger brother, André Peignot, was killed. The shock was immense for Georges Peignot. He immediately requested to be placed on the front in the same regiment as his late brother, the 23rd Colonial Infantry Regiment. In March, he succeeded and was posted on the front line. Everything went fast: 15 May 1915, the youngest of his brothers, Rémy, was killed in the same Somme sector of the front. On 25 July, Georges Peignot transmitted to his maternal cousin, Henri Menut, his power as manager of the company. On 28 September 1915, north of Arras, between Souchez and Givenchy, Georges Peignot was struck by a bullet in the forehead « immediately after shouting to his troops: "En avant ! (Forward !)" », as Lucien Peignot reported (the fourth and last brother who would also lose his life on 29 June 1916), and who had had time to conduct a long investigation to find his lost brother in the no man's land where he lay for a month. Georges Peignot, buried next to Rémy, is quoted in the order of the Division and was awarded the Military Cross and Military Medal.

== Posterity ==
Louis Barthou, former French Prime Minister, wrote in 1916 about Georges Peignot that he was recognized « for his active and open mind, impatient of initiatives, for the righteousness of his strong and loyal character, for his simmering and thoughtful passion for the noble art to which he had devoted his life. »

Georges Lecomte, Director of the École Estienne, said in 1918 about Georges and Lucien: « The Peignot brothers had conquered affectionate esteem of all book industry, of printers and publishers, of craftsmen and workers of the profession, of enthusiasts of fine editions, of writers who pay attention to how you print them. » They came in 1914 present him the Cochins and he still remembers « their tone of serious simplicity and modest satisfaction, (...) their refined but unpretentious friendliness. »

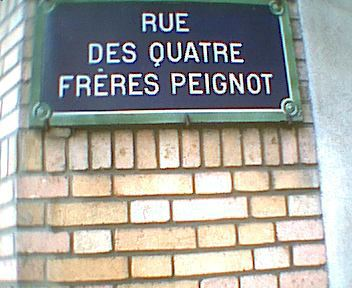
Street sign for "rue des Quatre-Frères-Peignot", in Paris (XVth arrondissement)

In 1922, the National "Committee for Education and Fine Arts" proposes to honor the history of Peignot: all the genuine punches of the Foundry and the bronze Gustave Peignot's statue are carried in the building of the Imprimerie nationale, across the Gutenberg street. The Committee proposes that the extension of this street would be called "rue des Quatre-Frères-Peignot" (Four-Brothers-Peignot street) in memory of the four dead brothers.

The typographer Maximilien Vox acknowledges his debt to Georges Peignot, for whom he was « the first French typographer who did not think of his job as confined to supplying the printer with little pieces of metal ».

The foundry's posterity was tainted by family maneuvers: after the war, Georges Peignot and four of his other brothers were dead (the eldest died of illness in 1913); the potential successors were the two girls or the mother. The latter managed in 1919 to impose his surviving children or their widows a 1 million capital increase, given to a competitor, the Deberny foundry, in financial difficulty... which was the property of Jane's husband. In 1923, under the pen of Mr. Pascaut, notary, a Deberny & Peignot company emerged, the result of the merger of Deberny (2.6 million francs capital, 1 million Peignot's family included) and G. Peignot et Fils briefly renamed "Peignot & Cie" (4.1 million francs).

== Typographical creations ==
List of types created by Georges Peignot:

- Grasset book, Grasset italic, Grasset and Mr Lambert decorations
- Française-légère, Française-allongée, the Auriol-labeur, Auriol-champlevé, Robur and Vignettes and ornaments (drawing with brush: George Auriol, 1902–1907);
- Bellery-Desfontaines-large, Bellery-Desfontaines-étroit and Vignettes and patterns Bellery (drawing: Henri Bellery-Desfontaines, 1910–1912);
- Polyphème (bold) and Cyclopéen (light) (anonymous creation, 1910);
- Cochin book, Cochin italic, Nicolas-Cochin book, Nicolas-Cochin italic (drawing: Georges Peignot, from genuine 18th century engravings, engraved by Charles Malin), Moreau-le-Jeune, Fournier-le-Jeune, Fournier vignettes et ornaments (drawing: P. Roy et A. Marty);
- Garamont book, Garamont italic and Vignettes Garamont (ancient, Ben Sussan moderns, postwar) (engraved by Henri Parmentier, from prints on rag paper of the genuine Garamond typeface, under careful control of Georges Peignot (1912–1914); launched in 1926);
- Naudin book, Naudin italic, Naudin champlevé and Fleurons Naudin (drawing: Bernard Naudin, 1909–1914; launched in 1924);
- Guy-Arnoux capitales (drawing: Guy Arnoux, 1914, inspired by the revolutionary era. Not completed).

== Decorations ==
- Military Medal
- 1914–1918 War Cross
- Palmes académiques

== Bibliography ==
- Froissart, Jean-Luc (2004), L'or, l'âme et les cendres du plomb. L'épopée des Peignot, 1815-1983 (in French), Paris: librairie Tekhnê, ISBN 2-9522836-0-5
- Amelia Hugill-Fontanel, 2002. II: History of the Peignot Typefoundry. Website part of a Graphic Arts Publishing Master thesis of Rochester Institute of Technology (USA)
- Linotype, 2007 Georges Peignot
- Michel Wlassikoff, 2014. Les Cochins, spécimen de la fonderie Deberny et Peignot (1932). Signes, website
