= Deberny & Peignot =

French type foundry

Fonderie Deberny et Peignot
- Company type: Defunct
- Industry: Type foundry
- Founded: 1923
- Defunct: 1972
- Headquarters: France
- Key people: Georges Peignot, Charles Peignot, Rémy Peignot

Deberny & Peignot (Fonderie Deberny et Peignot) was a French type foundry, created by the 1923 merger of G. Peignot & Fils and Deberny & Cie. It was bought by the Haas Type Foundry (Switzerland) in 1972, which in turn was merged into D. Stempel AG in 1985, then into Linotype GmbH in 1989, and is now part of Monotype Corporation.

Starting in 1925, the Deberny & Peignot type was distributed in the United States by the Continental Type Founders Association.

== Typefaces ==
These typefaces were produced by Deberny & Peignot:

- Acier Noir (1936, A.M. Cassandre)
- Ancien
- Astrée (1921, Robert Girard), the Stephenson Blake version is known as Mazarin
- Auriol, (1901–04, George Auriol)
- Auriol-Labeur (George Auriol)
- Auriol-Champlevé (George Auriol)
- Banjo (1930)
- Baskerville (1916), reengraved from the original punches.
- Bellery-Desfontaines (1910–1912, Henri Bellery-Desfontaines)
- Bifur (1929, A.M. Cassandre)
- Calligraphiques
- Cochin (Georges Peignot)
- Compactes Italiques
- Cristal (1955, Rémy Peignot)
- Cyclopéen (1910, anon.)
- Éclair (1935)
- Égyptienne (Adrian Frutiger)
- Film (1934, Marcel Jacno)
- Firmin Didot Cut from the original punches of Firmin Didot.
- Floride (1939, Imre Reiner)
- Fournier-le Jeune (1913) Based on the decorated letters of Pierre Simon Fournier.
- Française-allongée (George Auriol)
- Française-légère (George Auriol)
- Garamond, roman and italic (1926, Henri Parmentier) first called "Garamont," based on originals by Jean Jannon (1580–1635) held at the Imprimerie nationale, directed by Georges Peignot, from 1912 to 1914.
- Grasset (1898, Eugène Grasset)
- Guy-Arnoux capitales (1914, Guy Arnoux)
- Jacno (1950, Marcel Jacno)
- La Civilité
- Méridien (1957, Adrian Frutiger)
- Moreau-le-Jeune (P. Roy et A. Marty), later copied by Ludwig & Mayer as Sonderdruck.
- Naudin (1911–24, Bernard Naudin), a set of open face capitals that complement this face were sold in France as Champlevé and in the United States as Sylvan.
- Nicolas-Cochin, roman and italic (Georges Peignot)
- Olympic (1937), also called Slimblack
- Ondine (Adrian Frutiger)
- Pharaon (1933)
- Phoebus (1953, Adrian Frutiger)
- Peignot (1937, A. M. Cassandre)
- Polyphème (1910, anon.)
- President (1954, Adrian Frutiger)
- Robur Pale (c. 1912, George Auriol), variations are known as Royal Lining and Clair de lune.
- Scribe (1937, Marcel Jacno)
- Série 16 + Série 18
- Sphinx (1925, M. Deberny)
- Style moderne (ca. 1903), today, sold as Fantastic
- Touraine (1947, A.M. Cassandre)
- Univers (1957, Adrian Frutiger)

== Univers ==
Deberny & Peignot's release of "Univers" in 1957 was the first typeface to be manufactured simultaneously as hand-set type, Monotype mechanical type, and photo type, bridging all the technological advances that had developed over the history of typesetting to that time. The company produced twenty-one width and weight variations of "Univers," complete with an innovative numbering system that identified each characteristic, and dispensed with historical names, such as "bold" and "extra bold."
