= Francis Thibaudeau =

French typographer

- Born: 1860
- Died: 1925 (aged 64–65)
- Occupation: typographer
- Known for: Thibaudeau classification

Francis Thibaudeau (1860, Cholet, France – 1925, Paris) is a French typographer and creator of the first well-established system for classifying typefaces, the Thibaudeau classification. He devised his system while developing the catalogues for the Renault & Marcou and G. Peignot & Fils foundries in the early 20th century. He worked at G. Peignot & Fils (1898–1919), Peignot & Cie (1919–1923), and Deberny & Peignot (1923–1925).

His book, La lettre d'imprimerie (The Letter of the Printing Office), is printed in Auriol, a typeface designed by its namesake, George Auriol and reflecting typical Art Nouveau design. In this text, he states clearly his patriotic purpose: "May this work of popularization [...] inspire interest in the nature of the printed letter and then in the art of its use and applications, [...] for the greatest profit of the national industry and the triumph of French art."

== Publications by Thibaudeau ==
- Thibaudeau, Francis. La Lettre D'Imprimerie. Paris: Bureau de l'édition, 1921.
- Thibaudeau, Francis. Manuel français de typographie moderne. Paris: Bureau de l'édition, 1924.
