= Pillard =

Pillard is a French surname that may refer to

- Etta Pillard, American dancer
- Grace Graupe-Pillard, American artist
- Nina Pillard (born 1961), United States Circuit Judge
- Richard Pillard (born 1933), American psychiatrist
- Maurice Pillard Verneuil (1869–1942), French artist and decorator in the Art nouveau movement
