= G. Peignot et Fils =

French typographic foundry

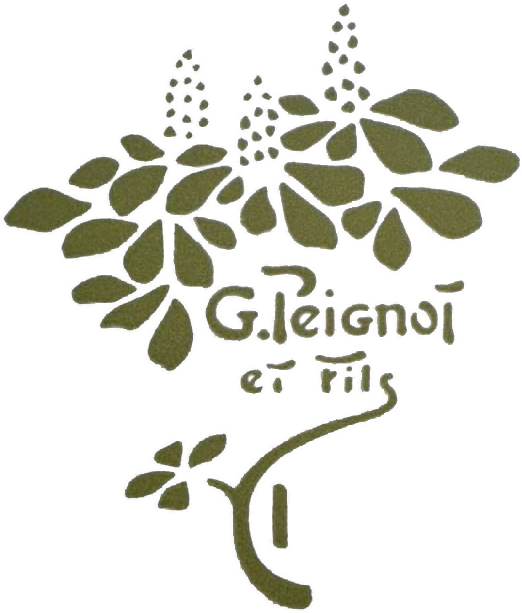
- Type: Kommanditgesellschaft
- Industry: Type foundry
- Founded: 1898
- Founder: Pierre Leclerc, Gustave Peignot
- Defunct: 1919
- Headquarters: Paris, France
- Key people: Georges Peignot

G. Peignot et Fils foundry (Fonderie G. Peignot et Fils) was a French typographic foundry, established in 1898 and closed down between 1919 and 1923 after a merger to become Deberny & Peignot foundry. Led by Georges Peignot (1872–1915), G. Peignot & Fils was a prestigious French typographic foundry, an "elite house", according to Louis Barthou, former French Prime Minister.

== History ==
G. Peignot et Fils is founded in 1898 in Paris, after absorption of the Veuve Routier et Peignot foundry (established in 1867), itself heir of the foundry "Veuve Routier" (established in 1865) and foundry of Pierre Leclerc (established in 1842).

=== Foundry of Pierre Leclerc (1842) ===
In 1842, Pierre Leclerc, a craftsman, creates a fixed spaces foundry (hand-set metal type to achieve letter-spacing) in Paris. "He can be considered as the genuine creator of the fixed spaces industry", says the magazine La fonderie typographique in 1899. These fixed spaces between words and lines, margins, etc., require great precision. He invents a new process, instead of cutting fixed spaces, pouring them into molds, which increases accuracy. In 1856, after his death, the company management is entrusted to a friend of his widow, Clémentine Dupont de Vieux Pont (wife Peignot, 1815-1897). She then settles beside her his son, Gustave Peignot (1839-1899), engineer of Arts et Métiers school.

=== Veuve Routier (1865) and Veuve Routier et G. Peignot (1867) foundries ===
In 1865, the foundry of Pierre Leclerc is sold by auction to Peignot. The new company is called "Veuve Routier" (Widow Routier), which is the name of the lessor having made possible the purchase by Gustave Peignot. In 1867, Gustave Peignot and the lessor merge in a company which takes the name of "Veuve Routier et Peignot."

In 1869, the company moved to Boulevard de Montrouge (now boulevard Edgar-Quinet), at no. 66-68, where a building is constructed (upstairs for the family, ground for the plant). In 1875, the debt to the Veuve Routier is cleared, and Gustave Peignot becomes sole owner of the company and the building.

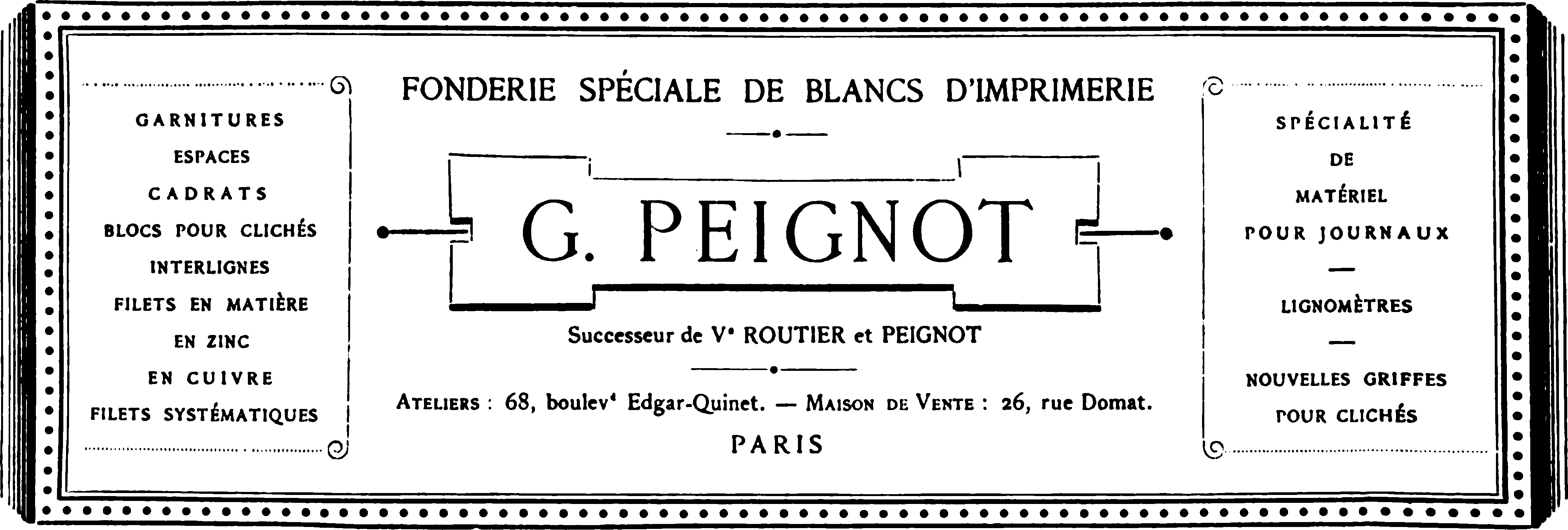
Advertisement for G. Peignot foundry published in L'imprimerie magazine, in 1883

From 1875 to 1898, Gustave Peignot continues to make great profits with fixed spaces production, not amputated this time by refunds to the Veuve Routier. "In this lead will Thou find gold", used to say his mother. At this time, Gustave Peignot becomes first President of the Chambre syndicale des maîtres fondeurs typographes (trade association of type foundry masters). He marries Marie Laporte, and is a father of 8 children.

=== G. Peignot et Fils Foundry (1898) ===
In 1898, Gustave Peignot distributes to his children an equal parts of stocks and appoints Georges Peignot, his second son, as co-manager. The company's name changes for "G. Peignot & Fils" (G. Peignot & Sons). He dies in 1899.

Georges Peignot continues the production of fixed spaces, causing significant growth in sales, and launches studies for new typefaces. The quality of fonts puts foundry G. Peignot et Fils at the forefront. In 12 years, Georges Peignot creates many typefaces: Grasset, Auriol, Cochin, Garamond-Peignot, Bellery-Desfontaines, Naudin, Guy-Arnoux. He also publishes a Specimen, great typefaces catalog (still highly sought, 600 pages, 2 volumes).

In 1904, to address growth of sales, G. Peignot et Fils built a new plant at the corner of Cabanis and Ferrus streets. In 1911-1912, Georges Peignot sends in South America his two young brothers, Lucien and Rémy, looking for distributors. The company is at its peak.

But war breaks out in 1914. Volunteer for the front, Adjudant Georges Peignot is killed by a bullet to the forehead at the head of his section, Sept. 28, 1915, near Givenchy. His four brothers also die.

The legacy of Georges Peignot is taken hostage by infighting: in 1919, his own mother, Marie Laporte-Peignot, requires its children or their widows the payment of a substantial sum (1 million of French francs, equivalent of USD [2015] 1,4 million) in the form of a capital increase to its competitor Deberny (founded by Balzac in 1826), owned by Charles Tuleu (heir of Alexandre de Berny and husband of Jane Peignot-Tuleu). In 1923, G. Peignot et Fils foundry disappears, victim of the merger between Deberny foundry (2.6 million, including the 1 million Peignot subsidy) and G. Peignot & Fils foundry (4.1 million). The new company's name relegates Peignot's name in background: the new entity is indeed called "Deberny et Peignot" and commonly called "Deberny". Against all logic (the manager is usually chosen by the majority shareholder), the manager of the small Deberny foundry, Robert Girard, under whom the old foundry Deberny had collapsed, takes the reins of the new entity.

In 1922, the Commission de l’enseignement et des beaux-arts (governmental Commission for education and fine arts) suggests honoring the story of Peignot: it transports the awls of the foundry in the building of the Imprimerie nationale (Government printing office), near Gutenberg street in Paris. And it proposes that the continuation of this street would be baptized "rue des Quatre-Frères-Peignot" (Four-brothers-Peignot street) in memory of Georges, André, Lucien and Rémy who died between September, 1914 and June, 1916, snatched by the World War I.

== Typographical creations ==
G. Peignot & Fils foundry is the heart of important typographic creations, including:

- the Grasset (drawing with reed pen : Eugène Grasset, 1898-1901);
- the Française-légère, the Française-allongée, the Auriol-labeur, the Auriol-champlevé, and the Robur (drawing with brush : George Auriol, 1902-1907);
- the Bellery-Desfontaines-large et le Bellery-Desfontaines-étroit (drawing : Henri Bellery-Desfontaines, 1910-1912);
- the Polyphème (bold) et le Cyclopéen (light) (anonymous creation, 1910);
- the Cochin book and italic, the Nicolas-Cochin book and italic, engraved by Charles Malin, the Moreau-le-Jeune, the Fournier-le-Jeune, the vignettes et ornaments Fournier (drawing : P. Roy et A. Marty);
- the Garamond book and italic (engraved by Henri Parmentier, from prints on rag paper of the genuine Garamond typeface, under careful control of Georges Peignot (1912-1914); launched in 1926);
- the Naudin book, italic and champlevé (drawing : Bernard Naudin, 1909-1914; launched in 1924);
- the Guy-Arnoux capitales (drawing : Guy Arnoux, 1914).

== Bibliography ==
- Froissart, Jean-Luc (2004), L'or, l'âme et les cendres du plomb. L'épopée des Peignot, 1815-1983 (in French), Paris: librairie Tekhnê, ISBN 2-9522836-0-5
- Amelia Hugill-Fontanel, 2002. II: History of the Peignot Typefoundry. Website part of a Graphic Arts Publishing Master thesis of Rochester Institute of Technology (USA)
- Linotype, 2007 Georges Peignot
- Michel Wlassikoff, 2014. Les Cochins, spécimen de la fonderie Deberny et Peignot (1932). Signes, website
