= André Édouard Marty =

Parisian artist

- Born: André Marty; April 16, 1882; 6th arrondissement of Paris
- Died: August 1974; Limeil-Brévannes
- Occupations: Illustrator, visual artist, graphic artist, etcher, wood carver, stage painter, xylographer
- Style: Art Deco

André Édouard Marty or A. É. Marty (April 16, 1882 – August 1974) was a Parisian artist who worked mainly in the classic Art Deco style.

== Career ==
Marty studied at the École des Beaux-Arts and Atelier Fernand Cormon in Montmartre, Paris. He was appointed on the jury for the 1925 Exposition internationale des Arts décoratifs et industriels modernes, from which the Art Deco movement took its name.

Marty was one of only four artists to contribute to every year of La Gazette du bon ton a leading pochoir fashion magazine in Paris and in Europe (1912 to 1925).

Marty also had illustrations published in Vogue, Harper's Bazaar, Vanity Fair, House & Garden, Le Sourire, Fémina, Modes et Manières d’Aujourd’hui and Comoedia Illustre, among others.

He also illustrated numerous books and designed advertisements and theatre posters (including a number of famous ones for the Ballets russes and the Théâtre National de l'Opéra in 1910).

During the 1910s, he worked with Georges Peignot on typographic vignettes and ornaments for the prestigious G. Peignot et Fils foundry.

In the 1930s Marty worked as a costume and set designer for the theatre, cinema and ballet. Later he also produced designs for enamel vases, plates and jewellery.

== Illustrated books ==
Incomplete list

- François de Bondy: Constance dans les cieux. 1932.
- Pierre Louÿs: Les Chansons de Bilitis. Editions de Cluny, 1937. Limited edition of 1500 copies.
- Alphonse Daudet: Lettres de mon moulin. L'Edition d'Art H.Piazza, 1940.
- Maurice Maeterlinck: L'Oiseau Bleu. 1945.
- Ovide. L'art d'aimer. Traduction nouvelle de Pierre Lièvre. 1935.
- Madame de La Fayette: La Princesse de Clèves. Avec des illustrations de A.-E. Marty. Paris: Ed. Émile-Paul Frères 1942.
- Gérard de Nerval: Sylvie. Illustrations de A.-E. Marty. Paris: Alphonse Jolly, 1949.
- Honoré de Balzac : La duchesse de Langeais, Editions Rombaldi, 1950.

== Related artists ==
- George Barbier
- Pierre Brissaud
- Georges Lepape
- Charles Martin
- Jean Saudé
