= Répertoire du goût moderne =

Book created in 1928–1929

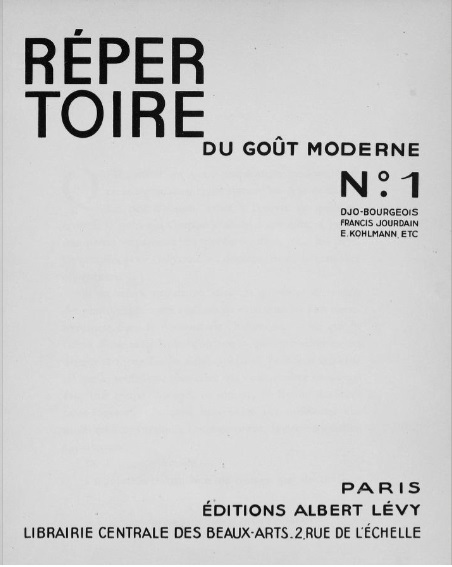
- Author: Multiple
- Language: French
- Subject: Interior design
- Publisher: Editions Albert Levy
- Publication date: 1928-1929
- Publication place: France
- Media type: Print (Hardcover)

The Répertoire du goût moderne is a five-volume set of folios depicting domestic interior design, created in 1928-29 and illustrated with the print technique pochoir by many famous designers and architects including Charlotte Perriand, Robert Mallet-Stevens, Gabriel Guevrekian, Francis Jourdain, Etienne Kohlmann, and Djo-Bourgeois. The pochoir plates were printed by the firm owned by Jean Saudé. Images from the folios may be found in the resource Artstor.

== Publisher ==
The imprint of the Répertoire du goût moderne reads: Editions Albert Lévy, Librairie de Central Beaux-Arts, 2, Rue de l'Échelle, Paris. Levy was the second in a line of publishers who had maintained the imprint Librairie Centrale des Beaux-Arts on topics around design, such as architecture and fashion.

== Bibliography ==
- Druesedow, Jean L. (1997). Authentic art deco interiors and furniture in full color. Mineola, N.Y.: Dover Publications.
- Hageney, Wolfgang (1986). Repertoire: Modern interior design, 1928-1929. Rome: Edition Belvedere (Firm).
- Schleuning, Sarah; Lamonaca, Marianne (2008). Moderne: fashioning the French interior. Miami Beach, Fla: Wolfsonian-Florida International University.
