= René Baschet =

French journalist (1860–1949)

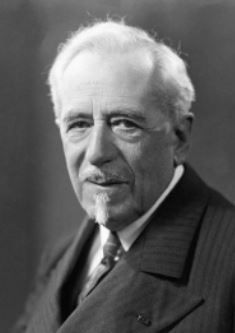
- Born: May 6, 1860; Paris, France
- Died: August 7, 1949 (aged 89); Paris, France

Paul René Baschet (6 May 1860, Paris - 7 August 1949, Paris) was a French journalist; best known as the director of L'Illustration.

== Biography ==
He was the eldest son of Ludovic Baschet, an art gallery owner and publisher. His younger brother was the portrait painter, Marcel Baschet. After completing his law studies, in 1882, his father entrusted him with managing the gallery, and a series of publications, beginning with the Paris illustré (1883), which experimented with color typography. Later, in 1885, he became the editor of his father's best known magazine, the Revue Illustrée, a position he held until 1904.

That year, the Baschet family acquired L'Illustration, a newspaper founded in 1843 by Édouard Charton, and René was named its director. In 1922, he joined with fellow journalist, Lucien Vogel, to create Le Jardin des modes, a monthly women's magazine. He was elected to the Académie des Beaux-Arts in 1935, where he took Seat #9 in the "Unattached" section; succeeding Justin de Selves, who had died the previous year.

In 1940 he, his family, and his editorial staff took refuge in Bordeaux. Their printing plant in Bobigny was destroyed by the German army. Shortly after, he went to Tours, in an attempt to relaunch his publications at the Imprimerie Mame. Later the same year, he and his eldest son, Louis, returned to Paris; doing as much as they could to keep their staff from being under the control of the Occupation authorities. However, after they rejected several anti-semitic articles submitted by the diplomat, Jacques de Lesdain, the German Ambassador, Otto Abetz, intervened to force him upon them as their political editor.

After the Liberation, Lesdain fled, and was condemned to death in absentia. The Baschets were also accused of being collaborators, but the charges were dismissed. L'Illustration, on the other hand, was found guilty, as a "juridicial person", and was ordered to cease publication.
