= Revue Illustrée =

Arts magazine in France (1885–1912)

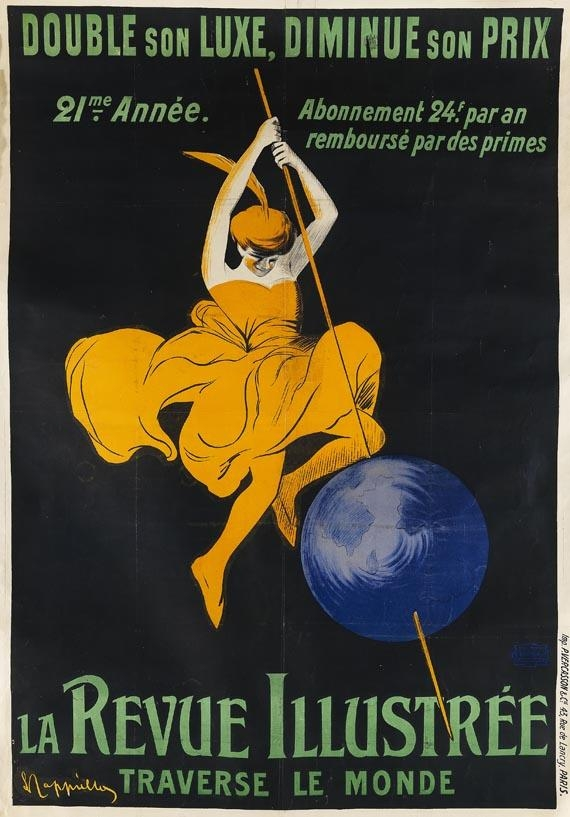
- Cover page of Revue illustrée dated 1906
- Categories: Arts magazine
- Frequency: Biweekly
- Founder: Ludovic Baschet
- Founded: 1885
- Final issue: 1912
- Country: France
- Based in: Paris
- Language: French

Revue Illustrée (French: Illustrated Magazine) was a French language biweekly arts magazine which was published between 1885 and 1912 in Paris, France.

== History and profile ==
Revue Illustrée was founded by Ludovic Baschet, an art gallery owner, and was first published on 5 December 1885 as a biweekly. It was based in Paris and directed by F. G. Dumas. From 1889 to 1904 Ludovic's son, René, edited the magazine, which targeted middle class readers and had high levels of circulation. The contributors included André Cahard, Henri Bellery-Desfontaines, Manuel Orazi and Carlos Schwabe. The literary and artistic direction was initially entrusted to the journalist and art editor François-Guillaume Dumas (1847–1919), who had already written several museum guides for the Baschet publishing house and who contributed to their weekly magazine Paris illustré. The magazine folded in 1912.
