= Thibaudeau classification =

In typography, the Thibaudeau Classification is a way to group typefaces into four general families, according to shape and serif character. Invented in 1921 by the French typographer Francis Thibaudeau, it was expanded by Maximilien Vox in 1954, and again in 1962 by Association Typographique Internationale (ATypI) into the VOX-ATypI classification of 11 families. The Thibaudeau system is nevertheless still beneficial in that it is simple to comprehend. Thibaudeau later supplemented the classification by adding the category of the Écritures (for the scripts) and the Fantaisies (for the advertising or display typefaces).

== Elzévirs ==
Triangular serif

This family contains typefaces with triangular serifs. It corresponds to the three classical categories (humanists, garaldes and transitionals) from the Vox-ATypI classification.

Examples: Garamond, Palatino, Times Roman

== Didots ==
Hairline serif

This family groups typefaces with linear or hairline serifs. It generally corresponds to modern or Didone categories.

Examples: Didot, Bodoni, Walbaum Roman

== Égyptiennes ==
Rectangular serif

This family contains slab serif typefaces, called Mechanistic in the Vox-ATypI classification.

Examples: Memphis, Rockwell

== Antiques ==
Sans serif

This is the sans serif family. In Vox-ATypI classification, this family corresponds to the Lineals.

Examples: Futura, Univers, Arial, Helvetica...
