= Cochin (typeface) =

Serif typeface

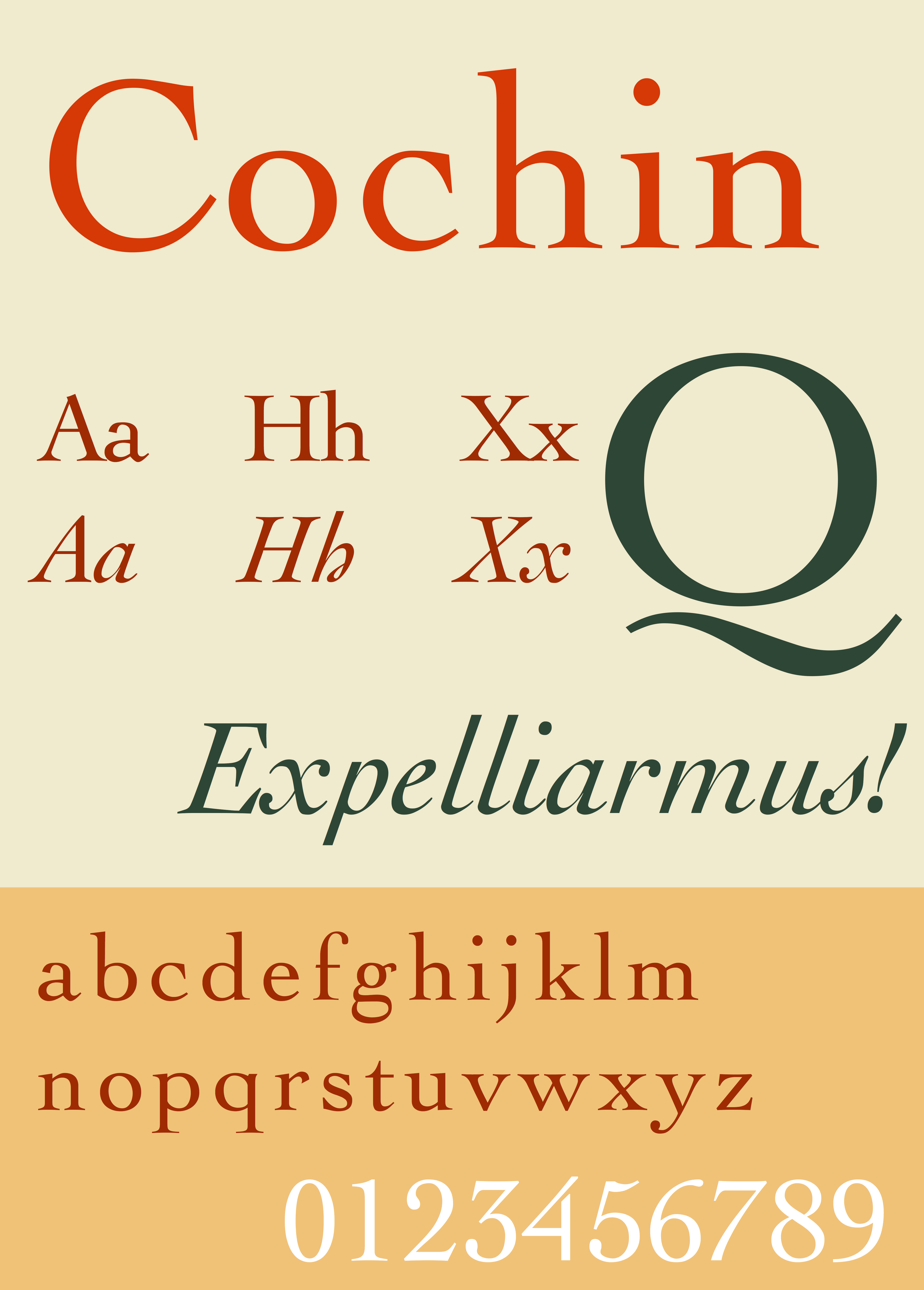
- Category: Serif
- Classification: Transitional
- Designers: Georges Peignot, Matthew Carter
- Foundry: G. Peignot et Fils
- Date created: 1912
- Re-issuing foundries: American Type Founders, Monotype, Linotype, Letraset, URW++
- Also known as: Sonderdruck

Cochin is a serif typeface designed by Georges Peignot for the Paris foundry G. Peignot et Fils (future Deberny & Peignot) in 1912. It is based on the copperplate engravings of 18th century French artist Charles-Nicolas Cochin, from whom the typeface also takes its name. The font has a small x-height with long ascenders. Georges Peignot also created the design Nicolas-Cochin as a looser variation in the same style.

== Characteristics ==
With a very low x-height and delicate design, Cochin is described by Walter Tracy an example of a style of lettering and graphic design popular in the early twentieth century in several countries. Similar designs are Astrée and later Bernhard Modern and Koch-Antiqua, as well as several designs by Frederic Goudy such as Pabst and Goudy Modern. It had considerable success, for example becoming available on Monotype's hot metal typesetting system in the United States (Tracy describes this version as disappointing due to changes to the italic) and was also sold by American Type Founders.

In 1927 Monotype UK produced a typeface Cochin Series 165, Roman and Italic, based on an 1812-face Cochin 18c of the Peignot-foundry. The Monotype font has fewer high ascenders compared with other Cochin-fonts. This makes Series-165 more usable for long texts.

=== Releases ===
In 1977 Cochin was adapted and expanded by Matthew Carter for Linotype, and this four-weight version is well-known today as a system font on macOS. Other companies issued versions of the design in the metal type era.

The original Cochin and Nicolas-Cochin designs were also digitised by LTC and Linotype, and other versions are available from others including URW++, which adds an additional black weight not available from Linotype. Sol Hess designed a bold design in the same style. Badr is an Arabic font from Linotype by Osman Husseini which uses Cochin for its Latin alphabet.

Cochin had a display open-face companion, with an empty space in the middle of the letter, named Moreau-le-jeune. This was sold as "Caslon Open Face" in the United States. A derivative design with boosted x-height is Academy Engraved by Letraset.

=== Gallery ===
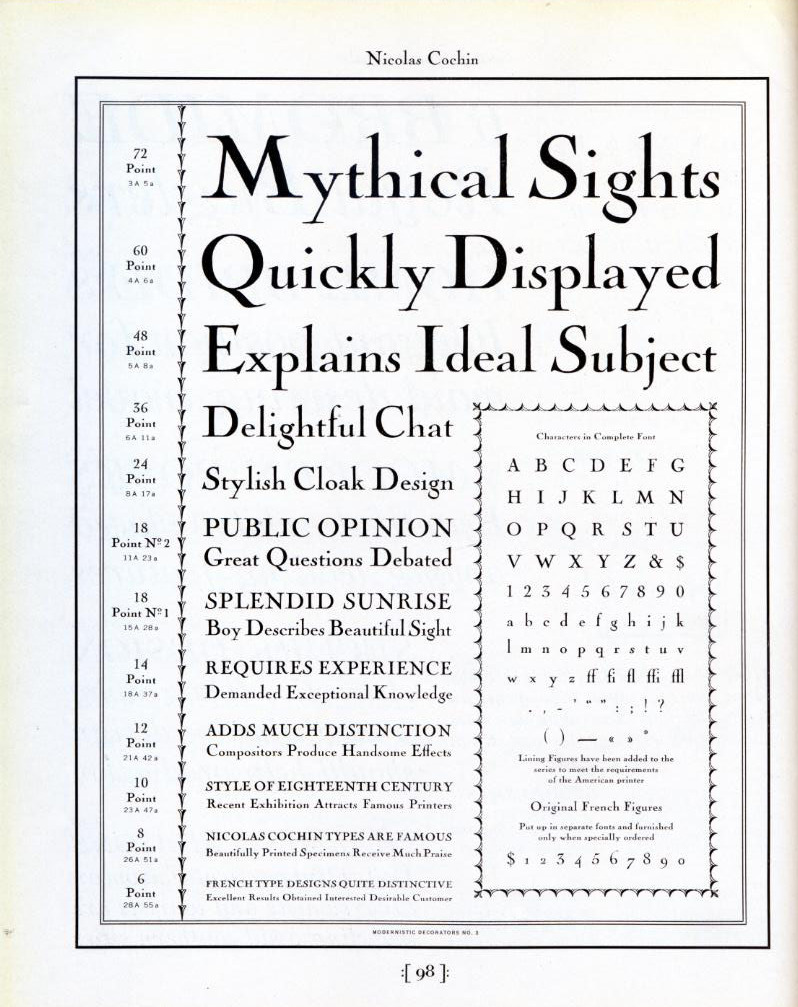
Nicholas Cochin

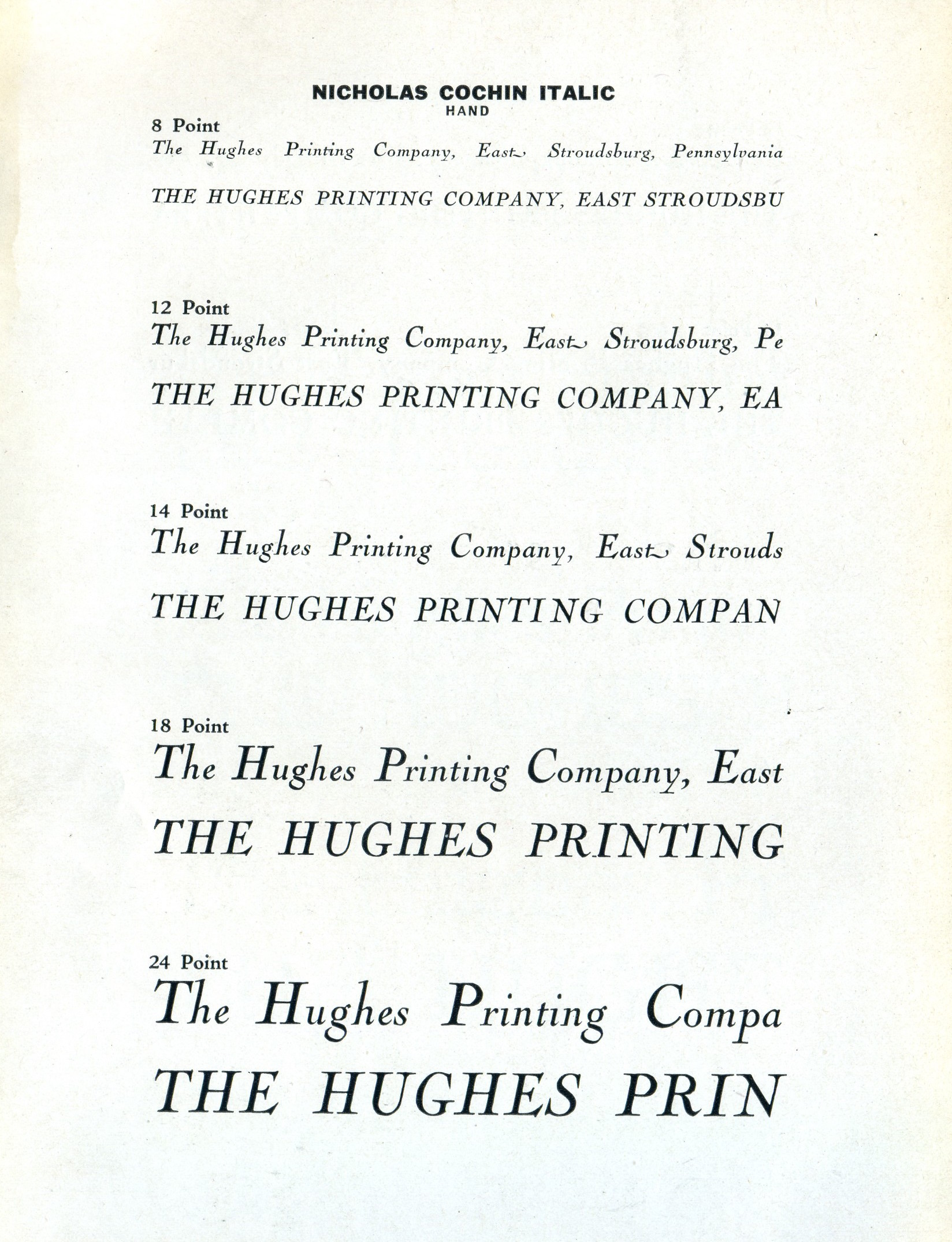
Nicholas Cochin italic

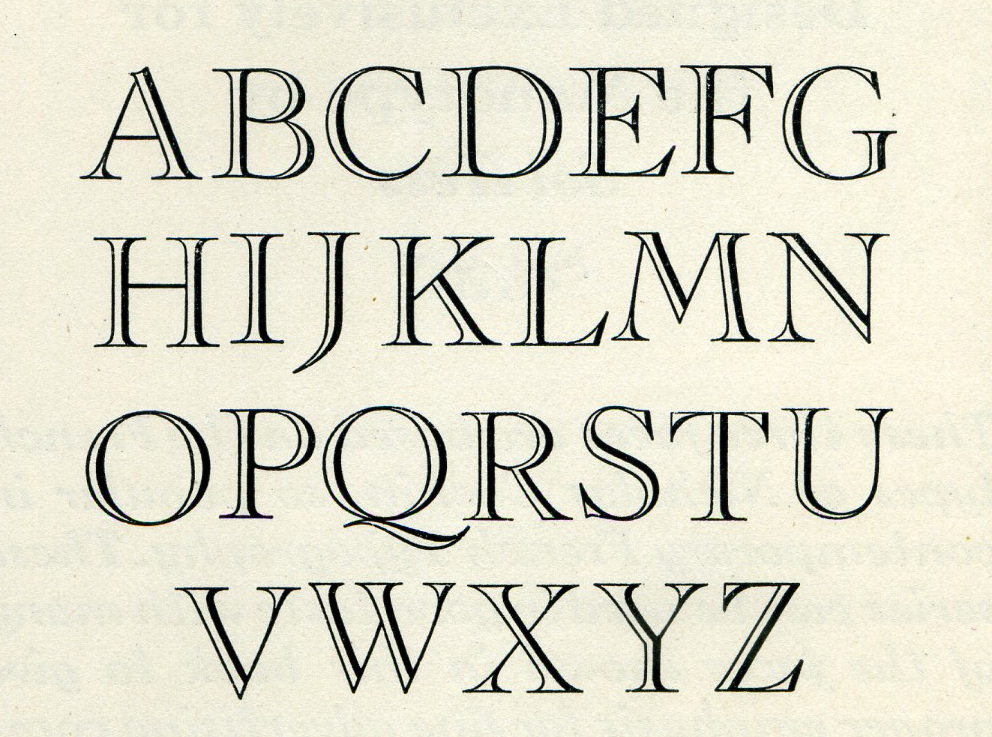
Outline capitals sold with Cochin

=== Uses ===
The typeface is used in the Harry Potter covers produced by Bloomsbury Publishing.

Cochin is used in The Spiderwick Chronicles (written by Holly Black and Tony DiTerlizzi).

The Editorial Nascimento of Santiago Chile, used Cochin in many of its 6500 publications, which included books by Pablo Neruda and Gabriela Mistral from 1923 onwards.

Cochin was previously a font option in iBooks for the iPad but was replaced in version 1.5 when Athelas, ITC Charter, Iowan Old Style, and Seravek were added.

The English alternative rock band Keane used the typeface for their first official logo.
