= George Auriol =

French poet, songwriter and graphic designer

- George Auriol
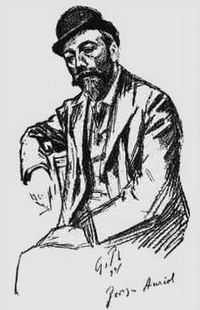
- Born: Jean Georges Huyot; 26 April 1863; Beauvais
- Died: February 1938; Paris
- Occupations: Type designer, poet, graphic designer, painter, songwriter, illustrator, drawer, typographer, singer, chansonnier, journalist, writer, artist, designer
- Children: Jean George Auriol
- Awards: Chevalier of the Legion of Honour (1926–)

Signature
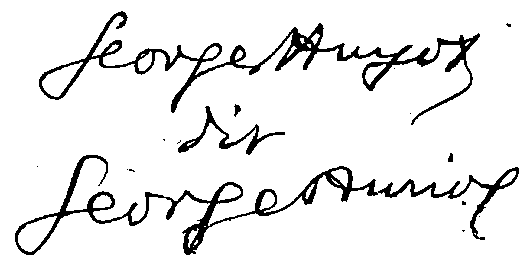

George Auriol, born Jean-Georges Huyot (26 April 1863) – February 1938, Paris), was a French poet, songwriter, graphic designer, type designer, and Art Nouveau artist. He worked in many media and created illustrations for the covers of magazines, books, and sheet music, as well as other types of work such as monograms and trademarks.

== Biography ==
Auriol was born in Beauvais (Oise. After he arrived in Paris in 1883, Auriol was introduced to typography and book design by Eugène Grasset and became particularly interested in the revival of historical type styles. Appointed by Georges Peignot, he created his signature typeface Auriol inspired by the Art Nouveau movement for the G. Peignot & Fils foundry, which was used in the work of Francis Thibaudeau and other publishers of the period. Auriol was a member of French bohemian culture, a denizen of the Chat Noir ("Black Cat Café") and long a friend of Erik Satie.

Georges Auriol was part of the Fumist group and learned a great deal from them, both in behavior and in creativity. Alphonse Allais greatly appreciated his free and ″incoherent″ manner of behavior and wrote several stories about him, one of which was called: ″My friend Georges Ariol″.

Auriol illustrated playbills for André Antoine's Théâtre Libre and for the Théâtre du Chat Noir in the Montmartre district of Paris, one of which became a popular poster.

== Typefaces ==
All fonts cast by G. Peignot & Fils.

- Auriol (1901–04)
- La Française (1902)
- L'Auriol (1903)
- Auriol Champlevé (1904)
- La Claire de Lune (1904–11)
- La Robur (1904–11)

== Works by George Auriol ==
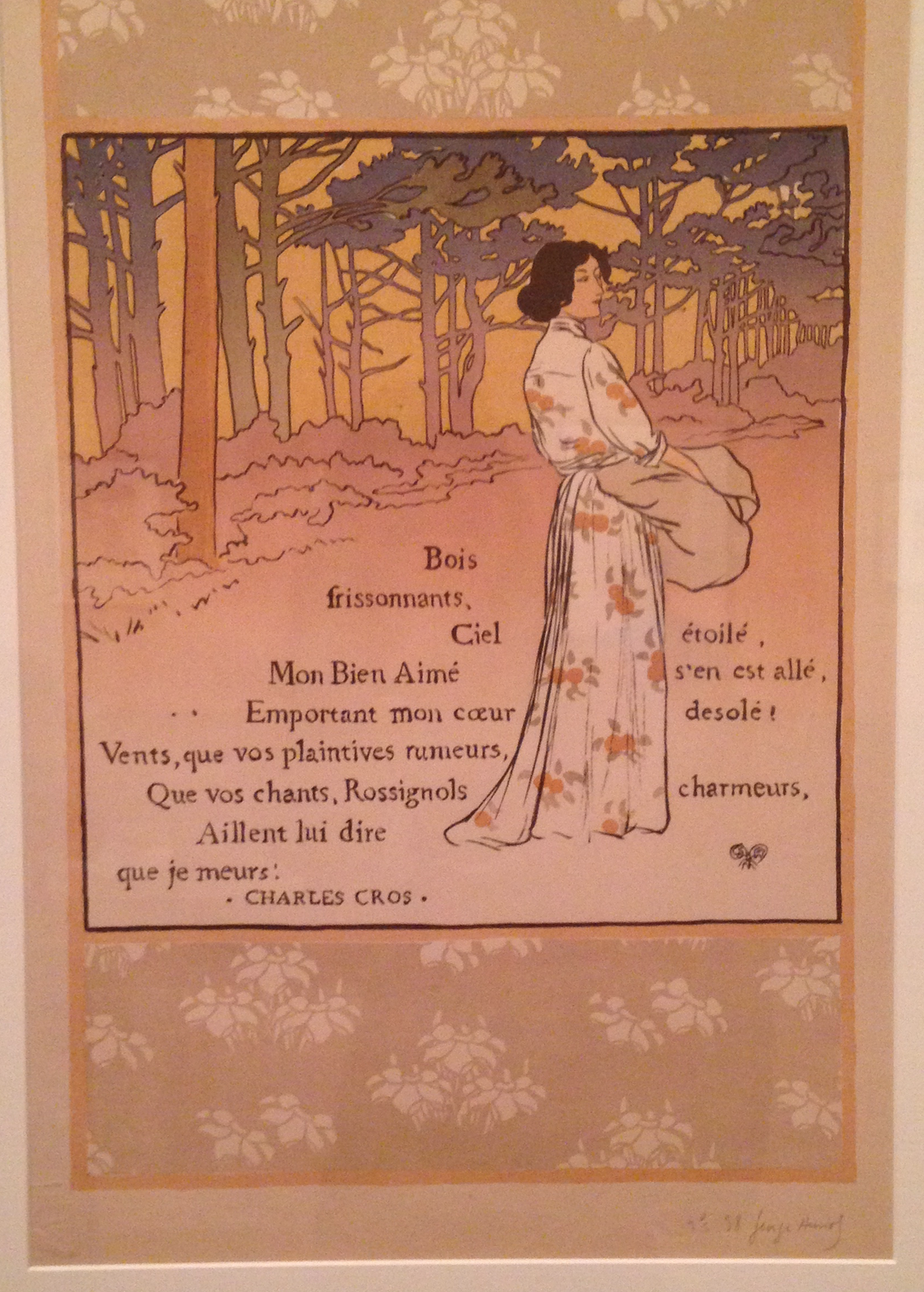
Bois Frissonnants, 1893, by George Auriol.

- The Harpsichord of Yeddo. Prose poem. Appears in English in Specimens of the Forms of Discourse, compiled and edited by E.H. Lewis (New York: Henry Holt and Co., 1900), p. 45.
- Le Premier Livre des cachets, marques, et monogrammes dessinés (Paris: Librairie Centrale des Beaux-Arts, 1901).
- Les Trente-six Vues de la Tour Eiffel, illustrations by Henri Rivière, prologue by Arsène Alexandre (Paris: Imprimerie Eugène Verneau, 1902). George Auriol: typography, layout, & design.
