= Etta Pillard =

American dancer

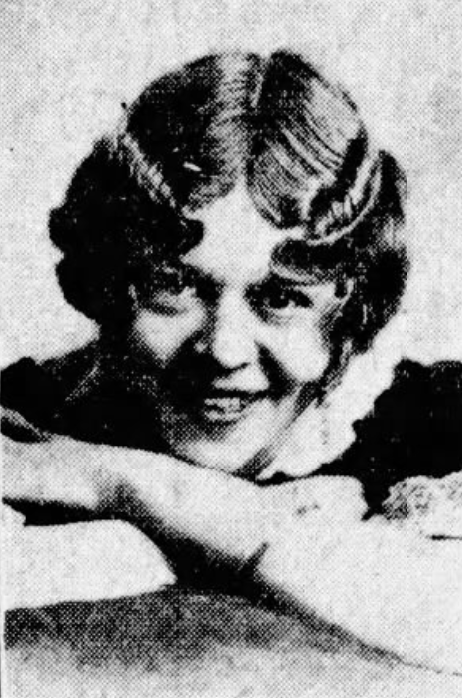
- Etta Pillard, from a 1914 newspaper
- Born: Henrietta Freda Pillard; September 3, 1888; Buffalo, New York, U.S.
- Died: after 1946
- Occupations: Dancer, vaudeville performer
- Spouse: George Stone

Henrietta Freda Pillard Stone (September 3, 1888 – after 1946), known as Etta Pillard, was an American vaudeville and burlesque performer, in a dancing act with her husband George Stone during the 1910s and 1920s.

== Early life ==
Pillard was from Buffalo, New York, the daughter of John V. Pillard and Alvena Ahrens Pillard. She began her stage career in her teens.

== Career ==
Pillard and Stone were a novelty dancing act billed as "Dancing Demons" in vaudeville and burlesque programs in the 1910s and 1920s. "As a dancing team, George Stone and Etta Pillard have no equal," reported a 1914 newspaper account. She appeared in The Social Maids, Artists and Models, The Wizard of Oz, The Ragdoll of Ragland, The Rose of Algeria, Babes in Toyland, Busy Little Cupid, and other musical shows. In the 1920s, Pillard and Stone starred in Flappers of 1925, and Flappers of 1926, and had their own company.

Pillard was often described as "dainty", but her weight fluctuated enough for a 1913 newspaper to comment that "she blossomed into a heavyweight last year", before it described her reducing regimen of hot baths. She described the hard work of burlesque dancers in interviews, suggesting that "the burlesque managers would get better results, as much if not more money, and burlesque performers more enjoyment in their work, if there were not the deadly drag and drudgery of two shows a day." She also gave tips on dressing quickly, like a showgirl, by planning and assembling outfits ahead of time.

In the 1930s, George Stone ran a roadside cafe in Nassau County. After he died in 1939, Etta Pillard and her brother Jack ran Stone's Tavern, advertised as "the Show Place of Baldwin".

== Personal life ==
Pillard married fellow vaudevillian George Stone in 1911. Her husband died in 1939. Etta Pillard Stone lived with her mother in Baldwin, New York until 1947.
