= Maurice Pillard Verneuil =

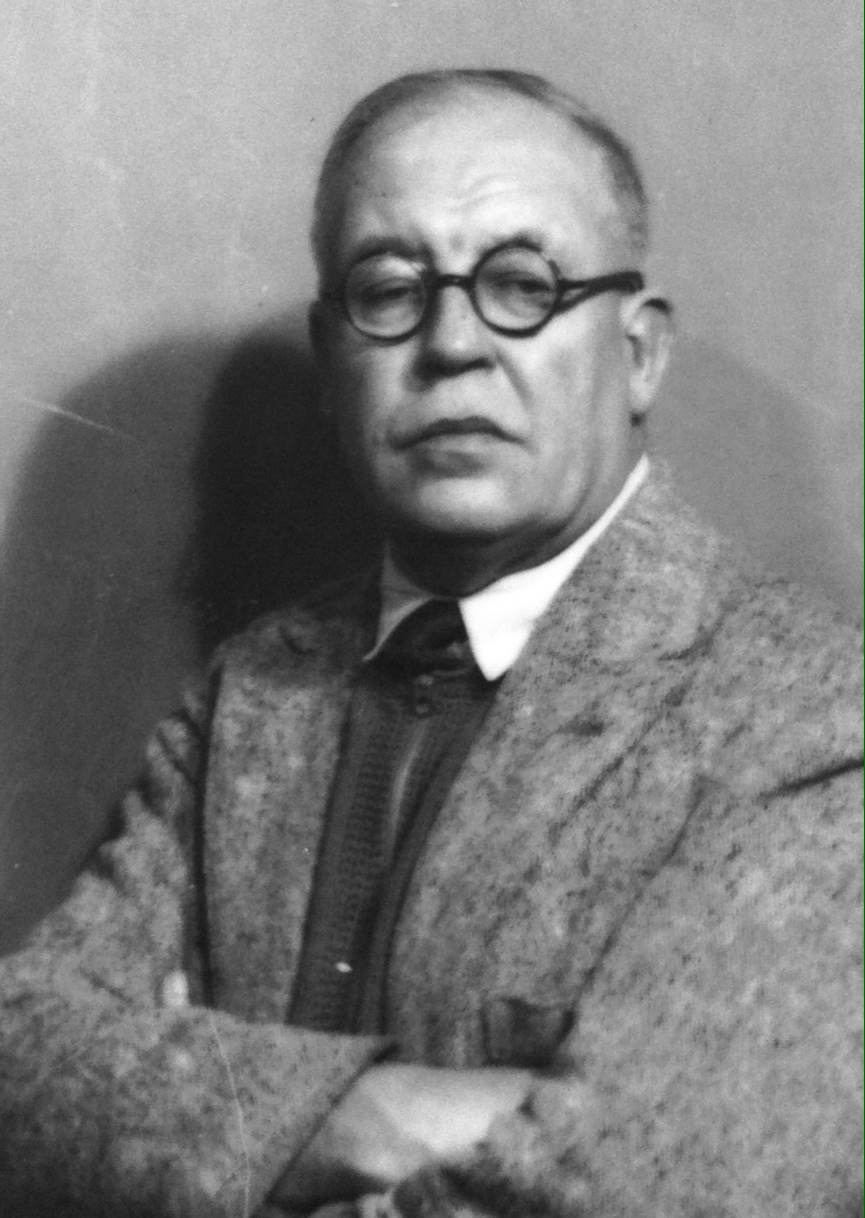
Maurice Pillard Verneuil

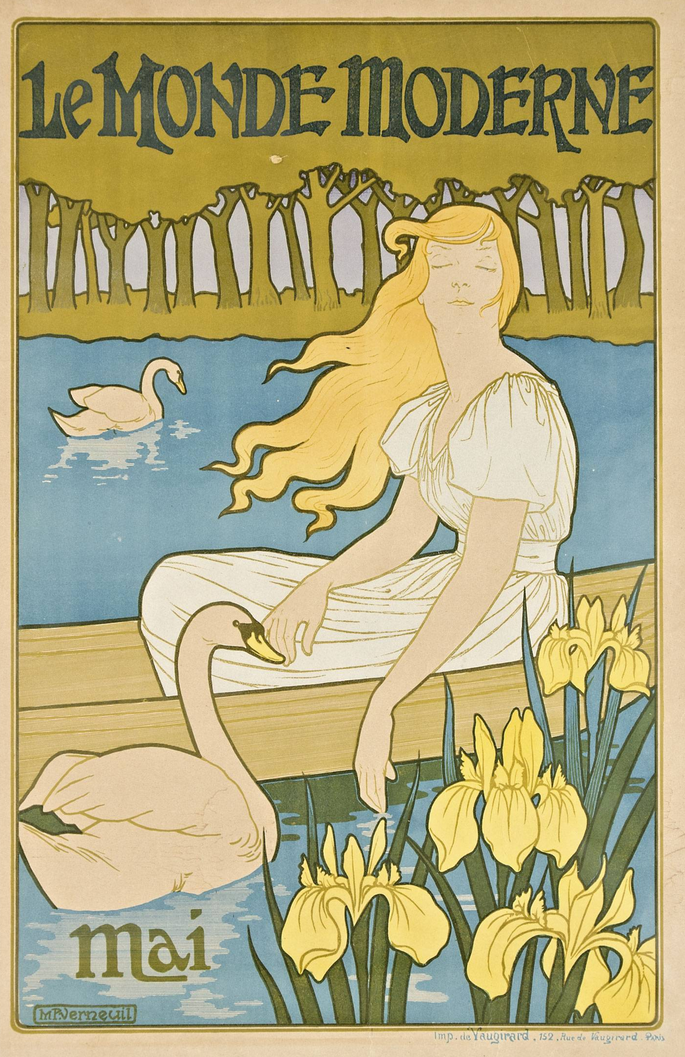
Poster from 1895

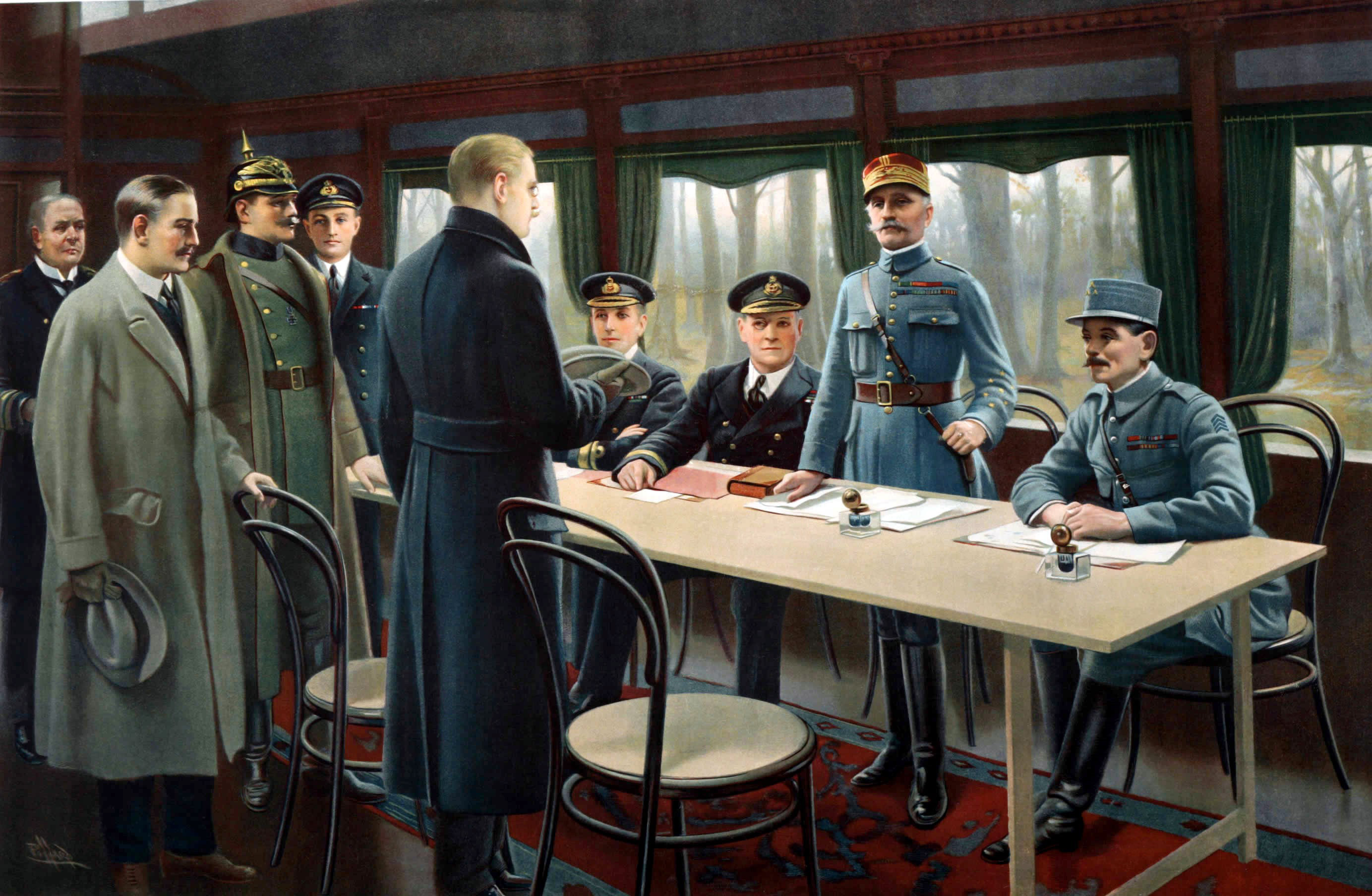
Picture of the Armistice of 11 November 1918

Maurice Pillard Verneuil (29 April 1869 – 21 September 1942) was a French artist and decorator in the Art Nouveau movement.

== Biography ==
He was born in Saint-Quentin, France. Maurice Pillard Verneuil learned his trade from the Swiss designer Eugène Grasset. Maurice Pillard Verneuil then went on to become a well-known artist and designer. He was inspired by Japanese art and nature, particularly the sea. He is known for his contribution to the Art Deco movement and, in particular, his use of bold, floral designs in ceramic tiles, wallpapers and other furnishing textiles.

His designs covered both the Art Nouveau and Art Deco periods subsequently transitioning into his much acclaimed geometric patterns. Verneuil also produced numerous poster works in France alongside the well-known artists such as Toulouse-Lautrec and Chéret. Other collaborators included Armand Point, René Juste, Alfons Mucha and Mathurin Méheut.

After the First World War, he moved to Geneva, and then, from 1921 to his death to Rivaz where he lived with his third wife, Adélaïde Verneuil de Marval, who was also a painter and the photomodel he used for his portfolio, "Images d'une femme", in the 1930s.

In 1925, Maurice Pillard Verneuil and his wife Adélaïde Verneuil de Marval worked together on the portfolio Kaleidoscope: Ornements abstraits, quatre-vingt-sept motifs en vingt planches. Composés par Ad.(élaïde) and M.P.Verneuil.

He trained many artists including Amédée Ozenfant. In 1923, he embarked with his wife Adélaïde Verneuil de Marval on a long voyage to the Far East, including visits to Cambodia, Indonesia, and Japan.
