= Jean Saudé =

French printmaker

Jean Saudé was a French printmaker in Paris, known for his mastery of the pochoir technique. He trained with André Marty in the 1890s before starting his own workshop called Ibis. In 1925 he published Traité d'enluminure d'art au pochoir, a guide to the pochoir technique. Jean Saudé produced prints for Kees van Dongen, André Devambez and other artists.
