= Bernard Naudin =

French painter

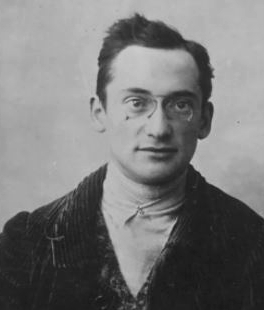
- Photo of Naudin, undated
- Born: Bernard Etienne Hubert Naudin; 11 November 1876; Châteauroux, France
- Died: 7 March 1946 (aged 69); Paris, France
- Resting place: Père Lachaise Cemetery
- Education: Académie Colarossi; École des beaux-arts de Paris
- Known for: Painting, caricaturing, engraving
- Spouse: Marie Louise Albessard (m. 1906)
- Awards: Knight of the Legion of Honour

Bernard Étienne Hubert Naudin (11 November 1876, Châteauroux – 7 March 1946, Paris) was a French painter, designer, caricaturist, and engraver.

== Early life ==
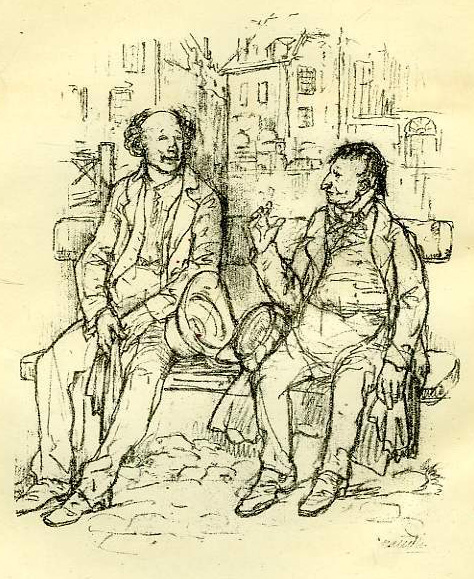
Bouvard and Pécuchet, from the satire by Flaubert

Naudin was born into a family of watchmakers and antique dealers. His father, who died in 1890, was also a painter and designer, and served as his first teacher. In 1891, he created his first illustration (a 17th century bagpiper) for Jean Baffier, the publisher of a literary revue called Le Réveil de la Gaule. The following year, he published his first collection, composed of scenes from the province of Berry.

In 1893, he moved to Paris and gave guitar lessons to pay for his studies at the Académie Colarossi, where he would later become a teacher. In 1897, he was able to obtain a scholarship from the city of Châteauroux, that enabled him to study at the École des beaux-arts de Paris with Léon Bonnat. His first exhibition was at the Salon des Indépendants. Soon, he was able to divide his time between a workshop in Paris and his hometown.

== Career ==
After 1906, he gave up painting to devote himself exclusively to drawing and printmaking; especially etching. His first large project involved illustrations for Peter Schlemihl (known in France as The Man Who Lost His Shadow), by Adalbert von Chamisso. He also contributed to revues, such as Le Cri de Paris. Most notably, he provided drawings and caricatures for the satirical journal L'Assiette au Beurre (The Butter Plate, equivalent to "pork barrel" in English). From 1909, he created several special issues; on war, homelessness, childhood abuse, and prisons.

In 1910, at the request of Georges Peignot, he designed and engraved a new type font, that was produced by the Deberny & Peignot foundry in 1911 and 1924. He organized his first personal exhibition of drawings and engravings at the Pavillon de Marsan in 1912. Two years later, at the beginning of World War I, he was drafted to be an infantry sergeant and became a war illustrator; depicting life in the trenches. His frontline work earned him a knighthood in the Legion of Honor.

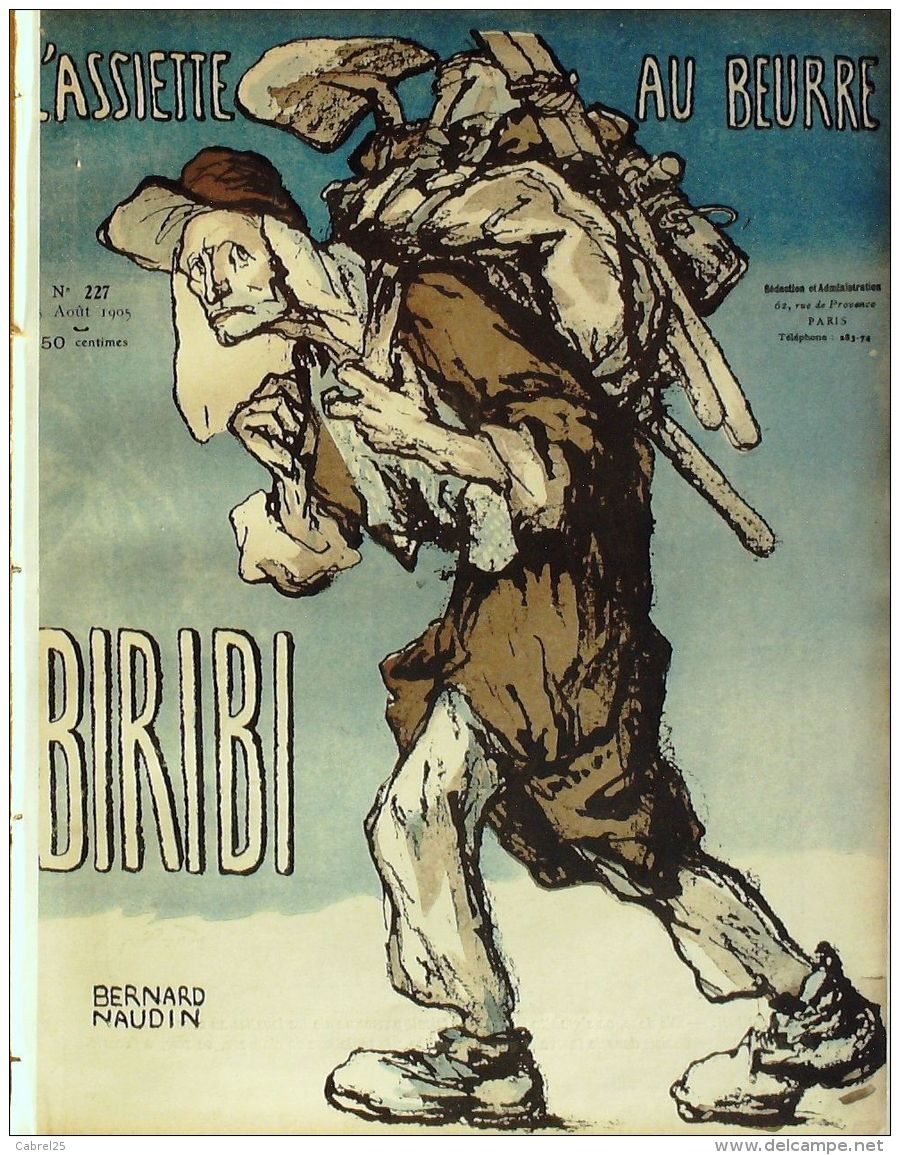
Cover from L'Assiette au Beurre; a 1905 issue on military prisons

In 1924, he was commissioned to design the Olympic diploma for the Summer Olympics in Paris. The following year, he provided all of the illustrations for a catalog celebrating the 150th anniversary of the perfumery, Houbigant, retracing the history of the establishment created by Jean-François Houbigant in 1775.

He also designed posters and labels. Diderot, Edgar Allan Poe, André Suarès, Georges Duhamel and Anatole France are among the many authors whose works he illustrated. A memorial plaque has been placed on his home in the 14e arrondissement.

His students included Jean de Botton, Jean Dreyfus-Stern, and Charles Emmanuel Jodelet.
