= Michel Wlassikoff =

Michel Wlassikoff is a historian of graphic design and typography, graduate in "Histoire de l'École des hautes études en sciences sociales" (Ehess).

== Biography ==
He directed the magazine Signes, from 1991 to 1998. He has also given many contributions to major graphic magazines in France (Etapes) and also in Europe and the rest of the world. He is also involved in the "Revues parlées" about Graphics at the Centre Georges-Pompidou.

He is a founder of the signs associated with Bernard Baissait and others.

He is responsible for the www.signes.org site dedicated to the history of graphic design and typography.

== Works ==
He has written books on graphic design including:

- Signes de la collaboration et de la résistance
- Histoire du graphisme en France
- Futura : Une gloire typographique co-written with Alexandre Dumas de Rauly,
- Mai 68 : L'affiche en héritage avec Marc Riboud.
