= Eugène Grasset =

Swiss decorative artist (1845–1917)

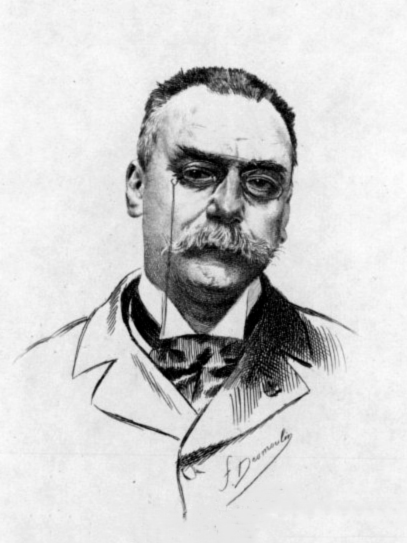
- Eugène Grasset, from Joseph Uzanne, Album Mariani, vol III; Paris: Floury, 1897
- Born: 25 May 1845; Lausanne, Switzerland
- Died: 23 October 1917 (aged 72); Sceaux, Hauts-de-Seine, France
- Style: Art Nouveau

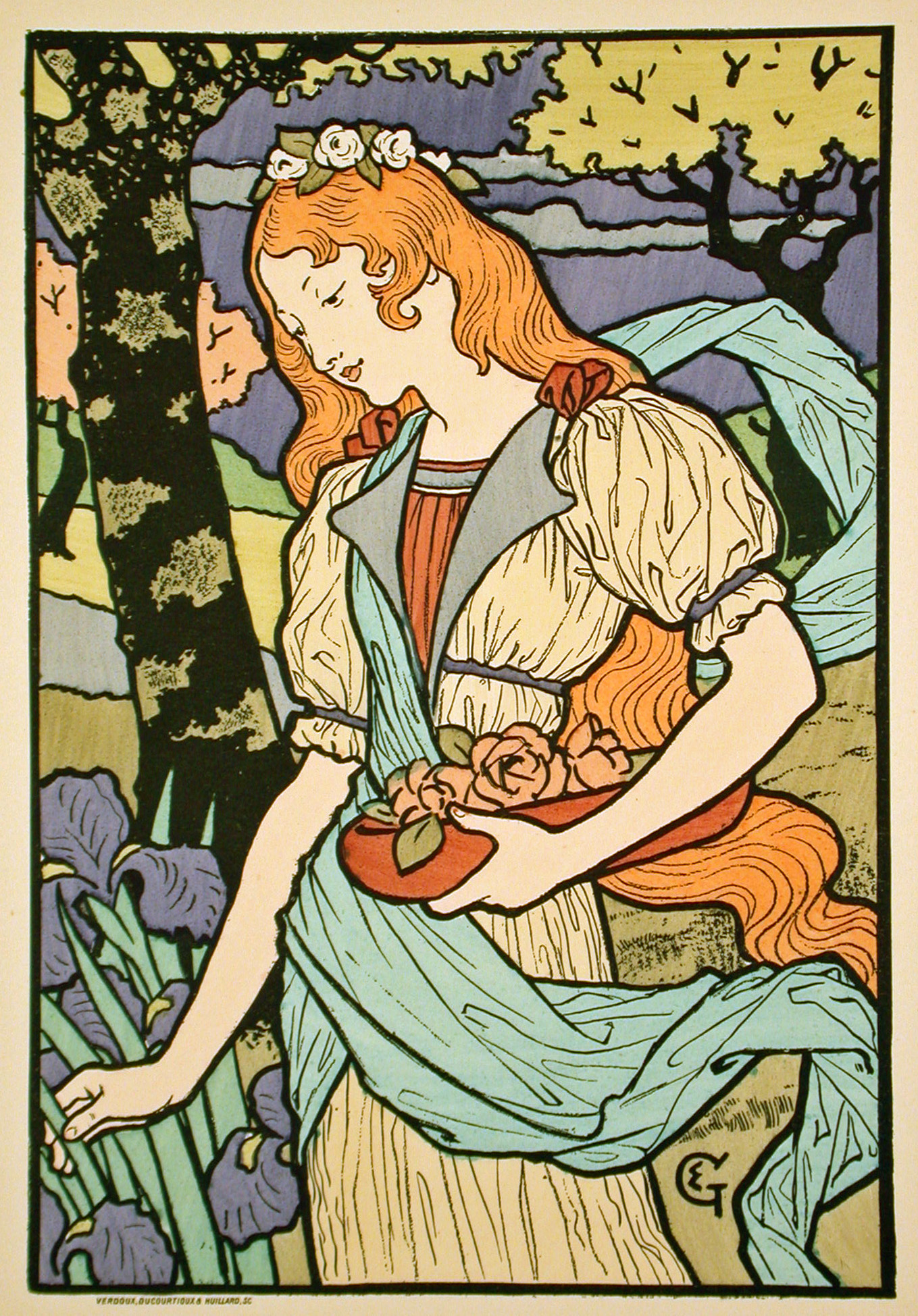
Eugène Samuel Grasset, poster for an exhibition of French decorative art at the Grafton Galleries, 1893

Eugène Samuel Grasset (French pronunciation: [øʒɛn samɥɛl ɡʁasɛ]; 25 May 1845 – 23 October 1917) was a Swiss decorative artist who worked in Paris, France in a variety of creative design fields during the Belle Époque. He is considered a pioneer in Art Nouveau design.

== Biography ==
Grasset was born in Lausanne, Switzerland on 25 May 1845. He was raised in an artistic environment as the son of a cabinetmaker and sculptor who taught him at an early age how to use the chisel and the gouge. He studied drawing under Francois-Louis David Bocion (1828–1890) and in 1861 went to Zürich to study architecture. After completing his education, he visited Egypt, an experience that would later be reflected in a number of his poster designs. He became an admirer of Japanese art, which influenced some of his designs as well.

Between 1869 and 1870, Grasset worked as a theater painter and sculptor in Lausanne. Here he met Viollet le Duc, whose reflection on the Middle Ages and the method advocating the link between form, function and material came to permeate Grasset's work. In 1871 he moved to Paris and he started to design furniture, wallpapers, fabrics, and tapestries as well as ceramics and jewelry. He created architectural elements of woodwork that were integrated into buildings. His fine art decorative pieces were crafted from ivory, gold, and other precious materials in unique combinations, and his creations are considered a cornerstone of Art Nouveau motifs and patterns.

In 1877 Eugène Grasset turned to graphic design, producing income-generating products such as postcards and eventually postage stamps for both France and Switzerland. It was poster art, based on the work of Viollet le Duc, that quickly became his forte. Some of his works became part of the Maîtres de l'Affiche, including his lithograph, "Jeanne d'Arc Sarah Bernhardt". In 1890, he designed the "Semeuse who spreads seeds of dandelion" logo used by the dictionary publishers, Éditions Larousse. Grasset's commercial work would be based on the drawings of Viollet le Duc.

With the growing popularity of French posters in the United States, Grasset was soon contacted by several American companies. In the 1880s, he did his first American commission and more success led to his cover design for the 1892 Christmas issue of Harper's Magazine. In 1894 he created "The Wooly Horse" and "The Sun of Austerlitz" for The Century Magazine to help advertise their serialized story on the life of Napoleon Bonaparte. The "Wooly Horse" image proved so popular that Louis Comfort Tiffany recreated it in stained glass. Grasset's work for U.S. institutions helped pave the way for Art Nouveau to dominate American art.

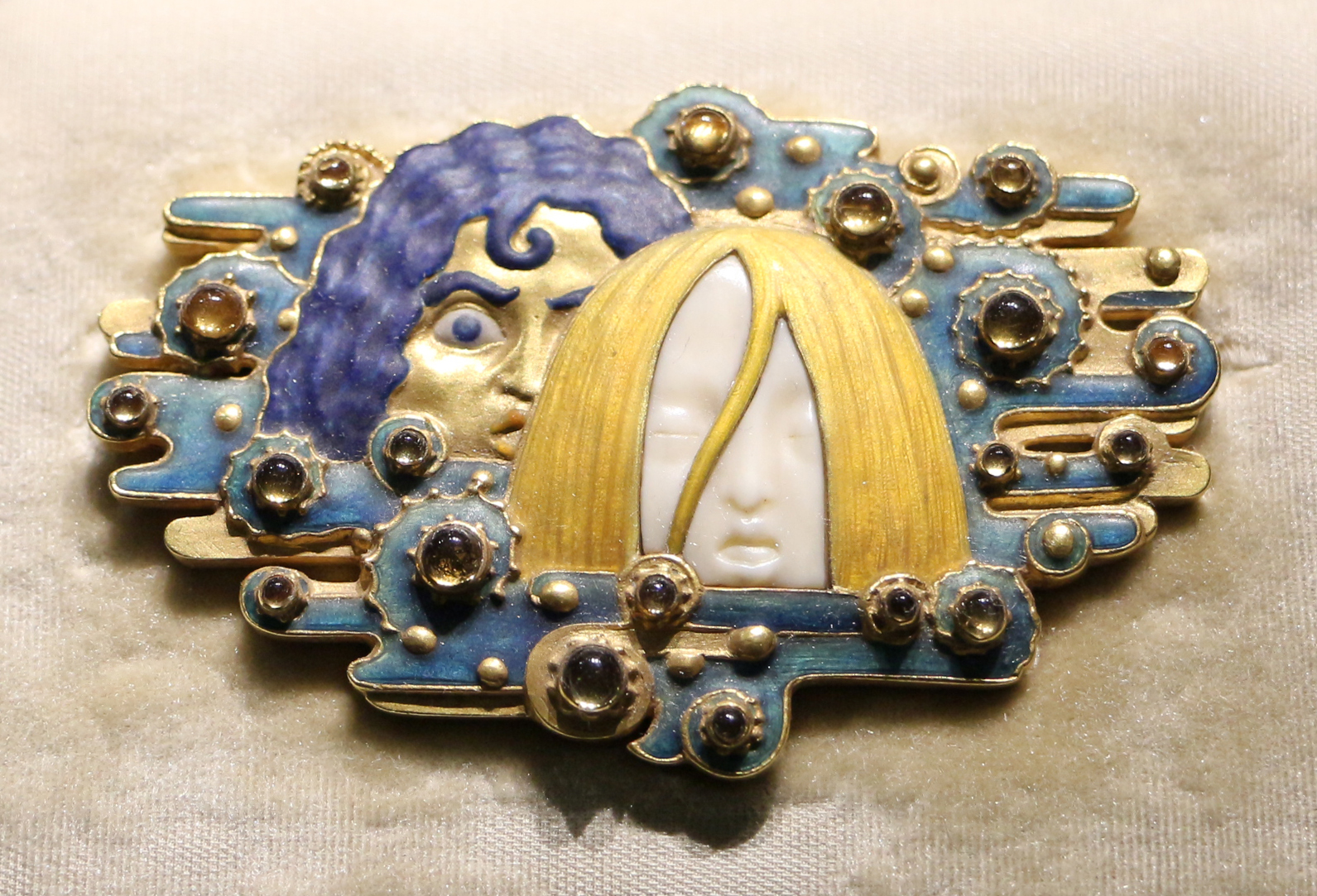
Apparitions, enamel brooch, Musée d'Orsay

Grasset taught design at the École Guérin from 1890 to 1903, at the École d’Art graphique in the rue Madame from 1903 to 1904, at the Académie de la Grande Chaumière from 1904 to 1913, and at the École Estienne in Paris. Grasset had freely adapted the alphabet of Nicolas Jenson (1471) with the intention of using it to print a book on his own method for ornamental composition, inspired by the courses he gave to the Guérin school. Georges Peignot acquired Grasset's alphabet and obtained an official patent on 7 October 1897 for the typeface under the name, "Grasset". He then gave Henri Parmentier, the workshop's punchcutter, the mission to engrave it.

In 1896 he published a dissertation on the use of plants in designs, that featured images of designs prepared by his students. Among his students were Paul Berthon, Georges Bourgeot, Paul Follot, Marcelle Gaudin, Augusto Giacometti, Arsène Herbinier, Anna Martin, Mathurin Méheut, Juliette Milési, Otto Ernst Schmidt, Auguste Silice, Maurice Pillard Verneuil, Aline Poitevin, Pierre Selmersheim, Tony Selmersheim, Camille Gabriel Schlumberger, Eliseu Visconti, and Philippe Wolfers

At the Universal Exhibition of 1900 in Paris, the G. Peignot et Fils typefoundry introduced the "Grasset" typeface, an Italic design created by Eugène Grasset in 1898 for use on some of his posters. Additionally, Grasset collaborated with jeweler Henri Vever, showcasing works such as the intricate 'Hercules' pendant, praised for its detailed artistry and mythological inspiration.

Grasset died in 1917 in Sceaux in the Hauts-de-Seine département, southwest of Paris.

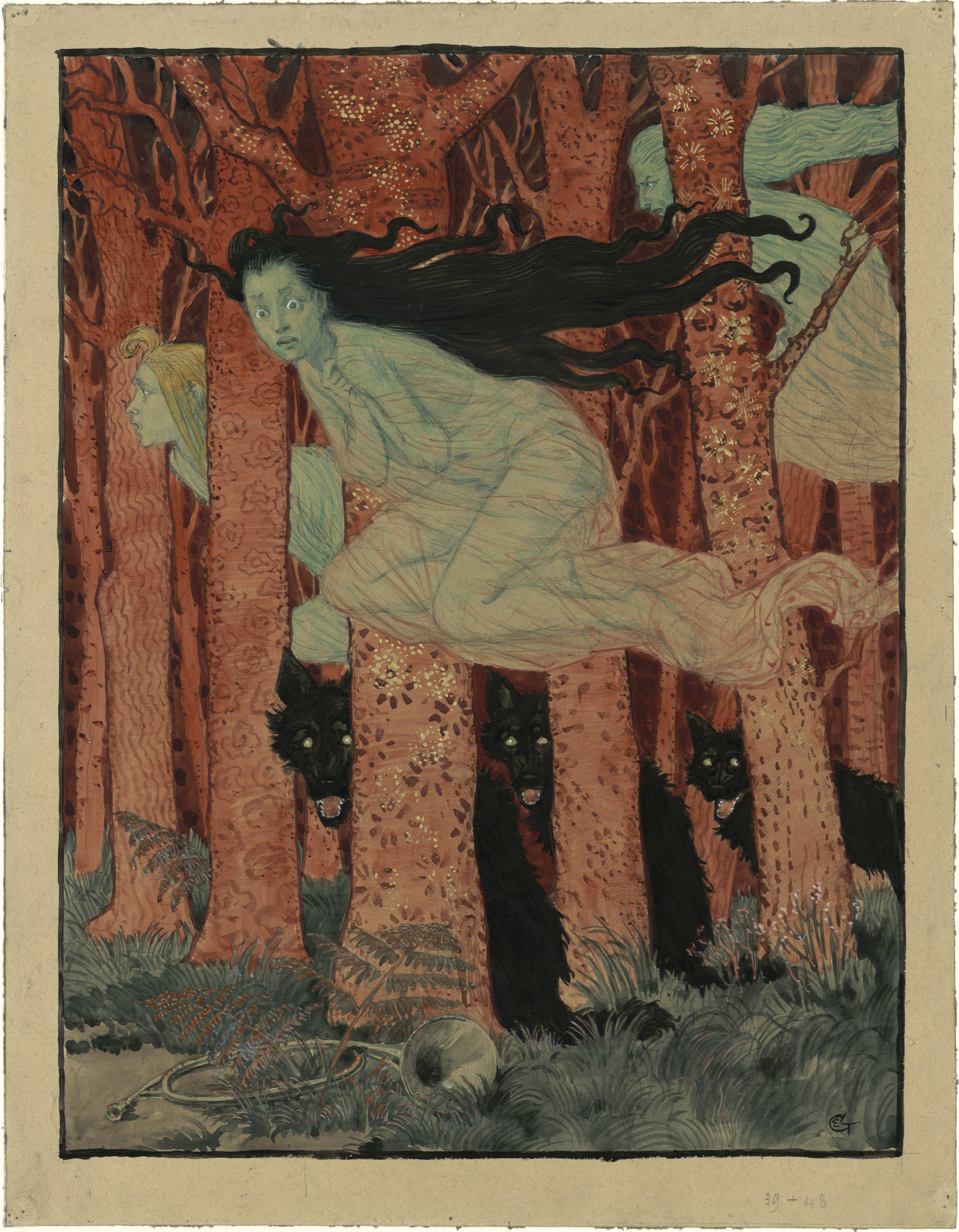
Grasset poster, Drei Frauen und drei Wölfe, c. 1892.

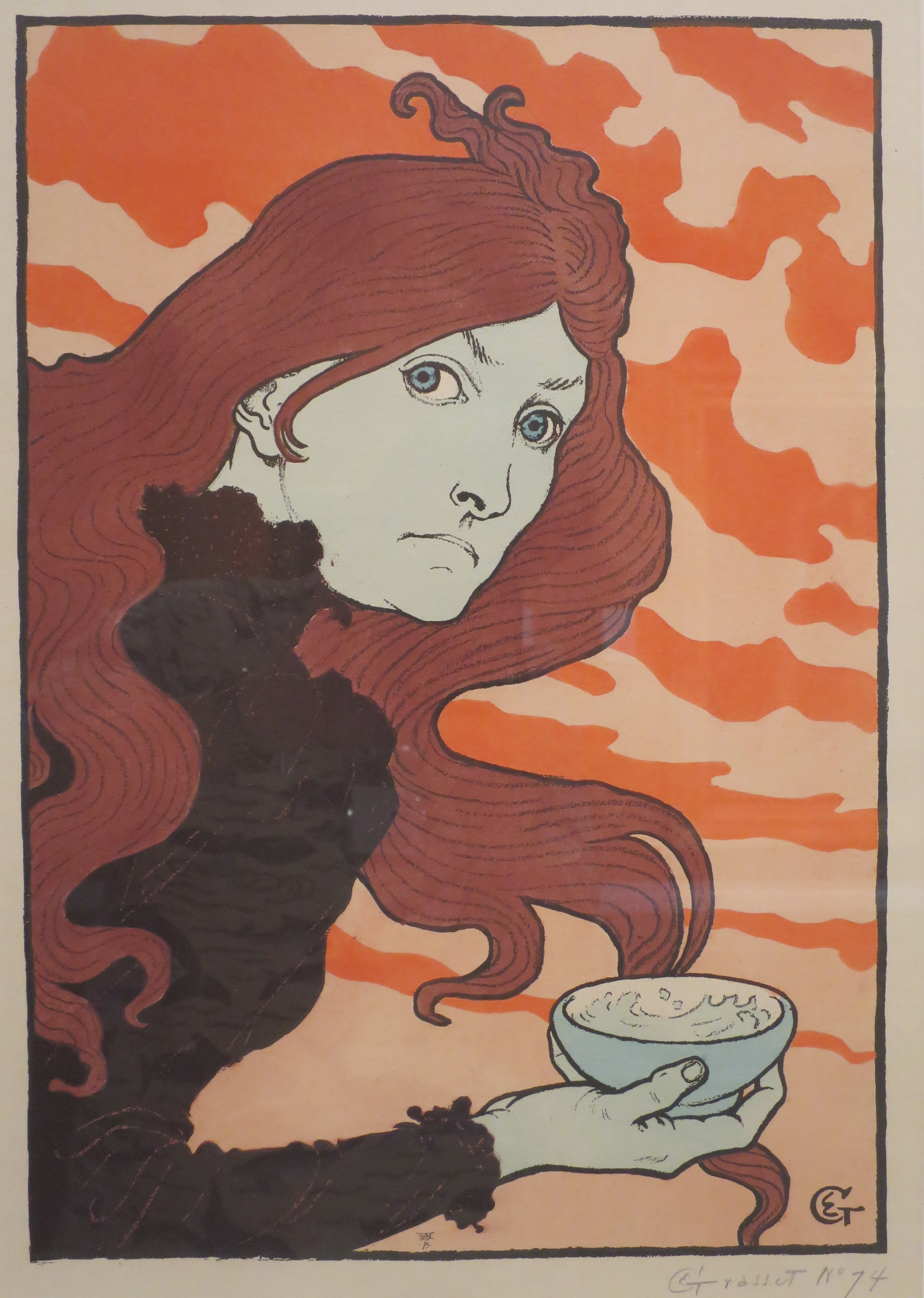
La Vitrioleuse ("The Acid Thrower"), 1894, lithograph with hand-stencilled colours, for L'Estampe originale

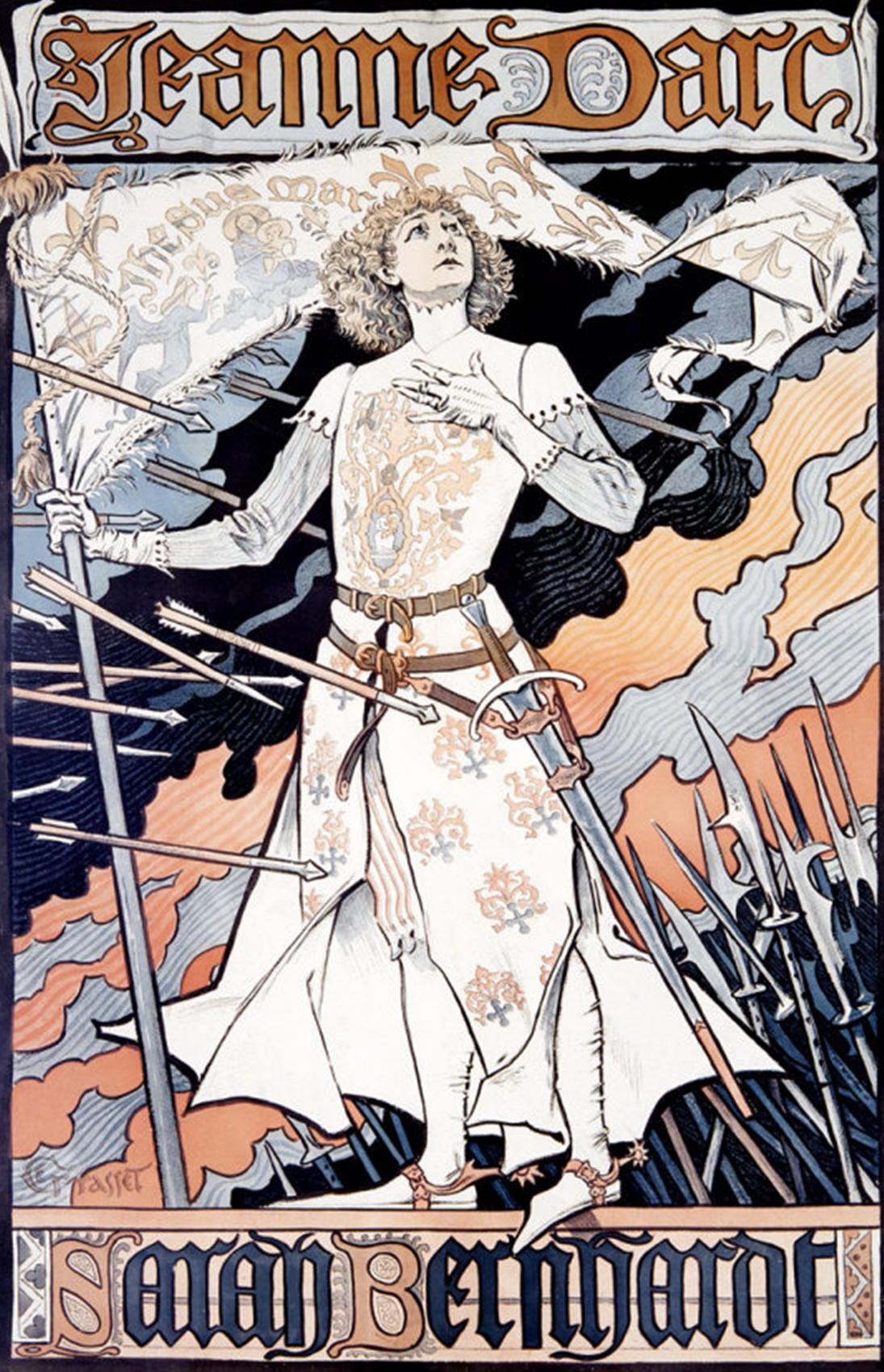
Sarah Bernhardt as Jeanne d'Arc

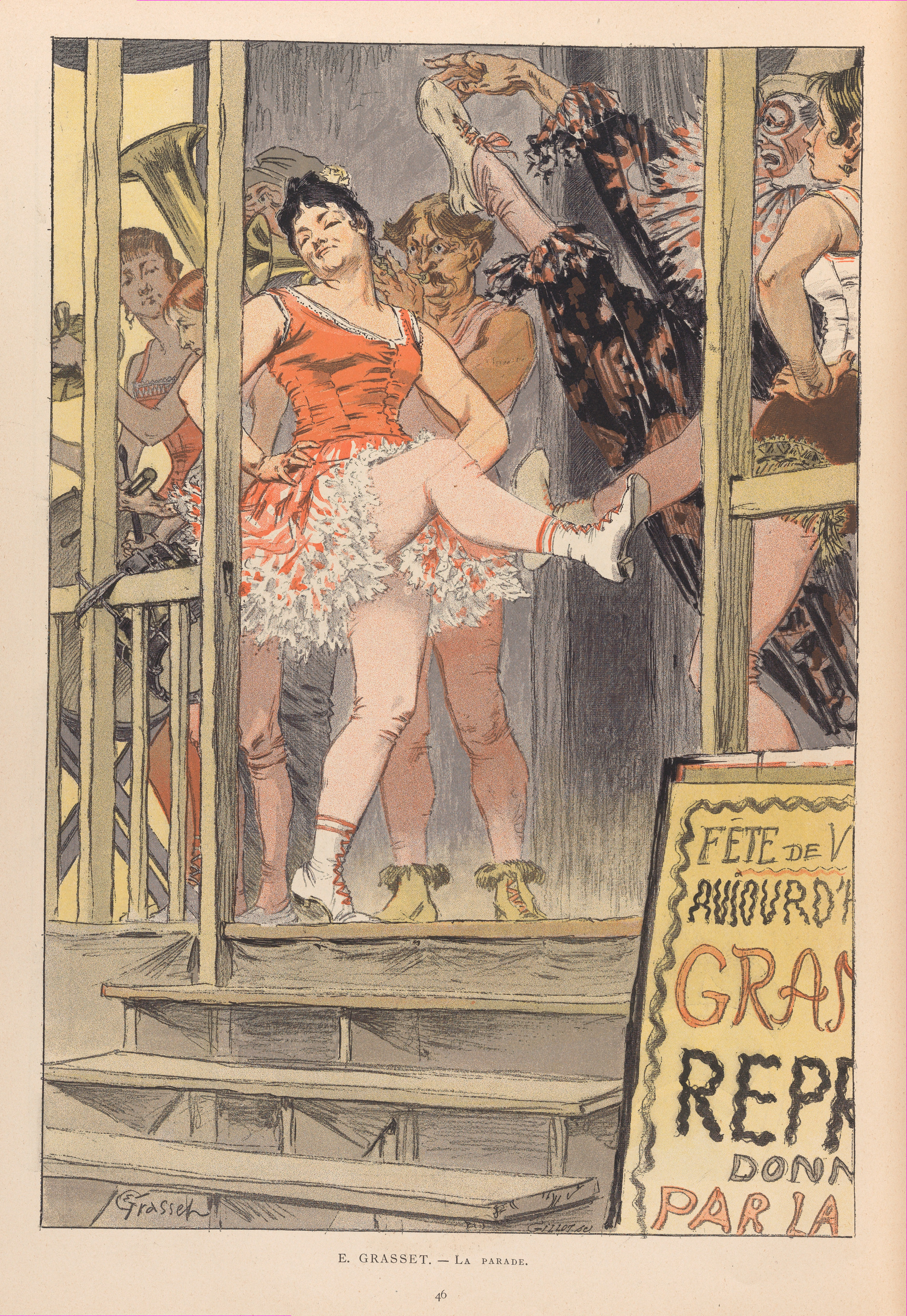
La danse, Issue no. 59 of Paris illustré, published 1887.

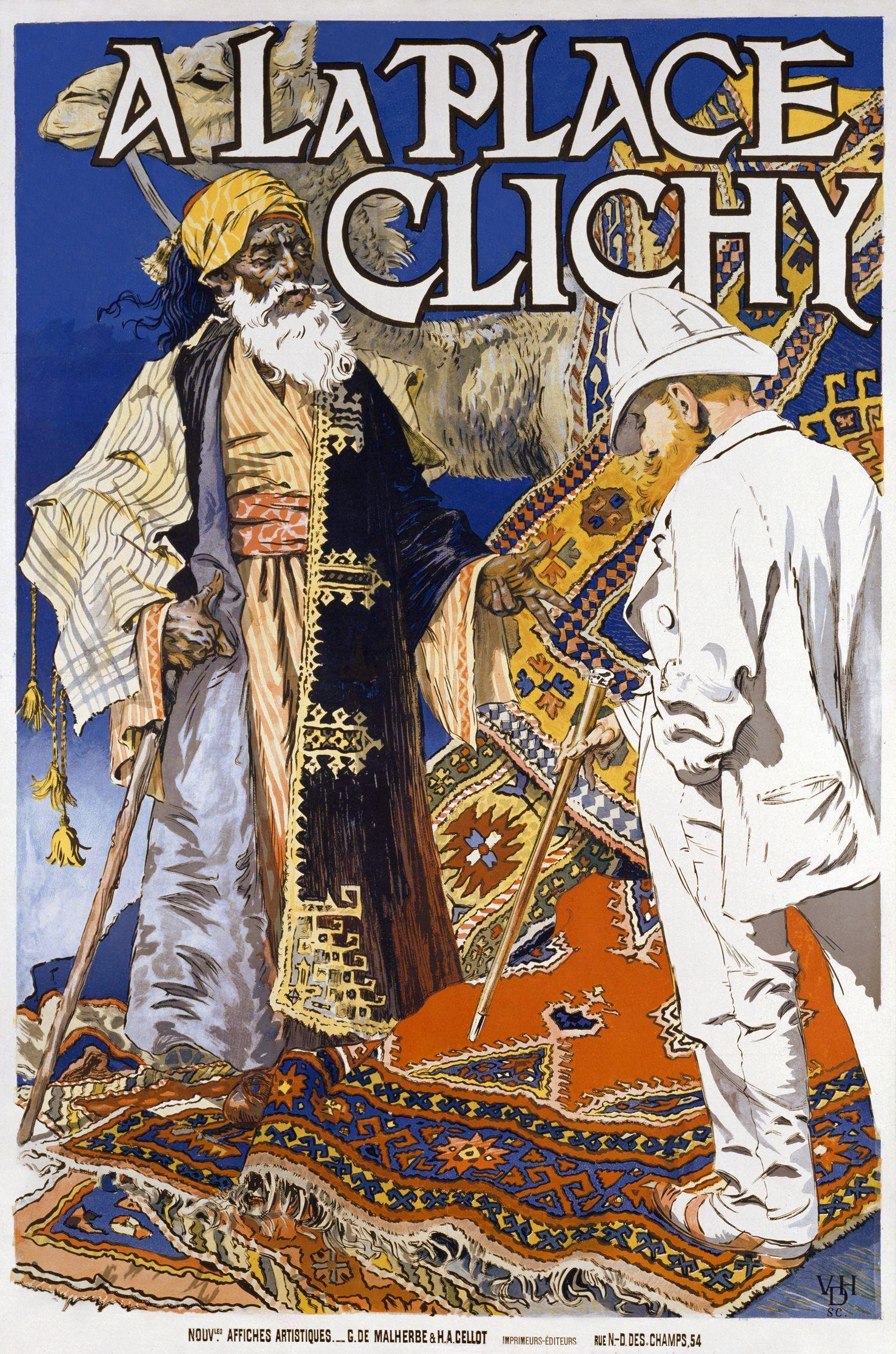
A La Place Clichy by Grasset, c. 1891

== Exhibitions ==
- Cantonal Museum of Fine Arts, Lausanne, 2011.

== See also ==
- Georges Peignot made the typeface, Grasset, at his foundry
- Grasset typeface
- Samantha Littlefield Huntley, one of his students

== General and cited references ==
- Anne Murray Robertson (1998). Eugène Grasset: une certaine image de la femme : [exposition, Fondation Neumann, Gingins, 17 septembre 1998 - 31 janvier 1999]. Skira. ISBN 978-88-8118-409-5.
- Jean-François Luneau (2006). Félix Gaudin: peintre-verrier et mosaïste, 1851-1930. Presses Univ Blaise Pascal. ISBN 978-2-84516-284-6.
