= Fournier MT =

Fournier is the name commonly applied to typefaces which are based on the typefaces of Parisian typefounder Pierre-Simon Fournier around the 1740s. Created in the Rococo style and influenced by the Romain du Roi typefaces commissioned by the French government in the previous century, Fournier's typefaces showed an advanced delicacy above what was previously common.

Modern Fournier revivals include Monotype Fournier, created by the Monotype Corporation of Britain in the 1920s, Barbou, an alternative revival designed simultaneously by Monotype but not entered into mass production, and Corundum by Joshua Darden.
