= Henri Bellery-Desfontaines =

French painter

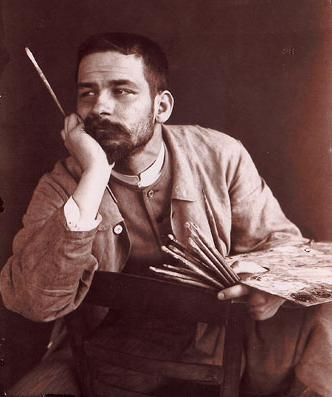
- Born: 20 March 1867
- Died: 7 October 1909 (aged 42)
- Occupation: artist
- Movement: Art Nouveau

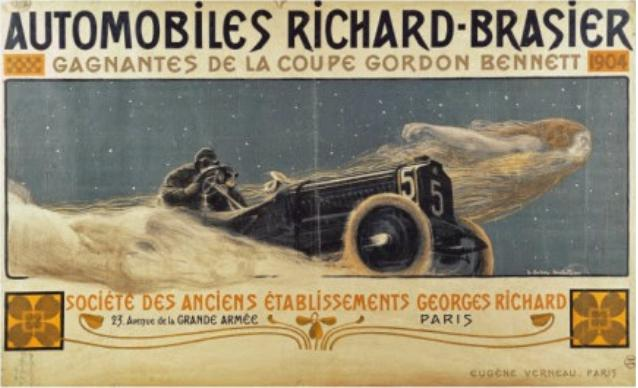
Poster for Richard-Brasier automobiles by Henri Bellery-Desfontaines, 1905.

Henri Bellery-Desfontaines (20 March 1867 – 7 October 1909) was a French Art Nouveau painter, decorator and illustrator renowned for his posters, lithographs, tapestries, furniture, bank note designs, typography, and other works of decorative arts.

== Career ==
Henri Bellery-Desfontaines was born in Paris. He is thought to have begun his artistic training under the tutelage of Luc-Olivier Merson. During his years as a student, he began to illustrate magazines. In 1895, drawn to illustration, probably due to financial problems, and he started to produce work for publications such as Revue Illustrée, L'Image, L'Estampe Moderne, and L'Almanach des Bibliophiles. In the same year, the Salon des Artistes Français hosted one of his tapestry designs.

In the 1900s, Paris was the perfect place for a group of young artists influenced by artistic currents like neogothic style or symbolism. Most of them began as painters, switching later to decorative arts attracted by the ideas of ever-present art and total art. Henri Bellery-Desfontaines was a member of this group. He started as a painter in atelier of Pierre-Victor Galland, who entrusted him with the decorative motifs that would frame drawings of the Panthéon de Paris. Maillot, Bonnat, Humbert and notably Jean-Paul Laurens convinced him to join the atelier at the École des Beaux-Arts de Paris, and with him, decorated the Hôtel de Ville de Paris.

Bellery-Desfontaines gradually achieved notoriety as an ambitious decorative artist, designing tapestries and furniture adorned with ornate floral and vegetal motifs for wealthy patrons. He made numerous commercial illustrations, created the joker for the playing cards company Fossorier Amar et Cie., and typography for Fonderie G. Peignot et Fils, including the typefaces Bellery-Desfontaines-large and Bellery-Desfontaines-étroit. He also was an important fine artist and printmaker of his epoch, painting portraits of Yvette Guilbert and Jean Mounet-Sully, and participating in numerous events such as the Bal des Quat'z'Arts and Bal de l'Internat.

Bellery-Desfontaines died in Saint-Martin-aux-Buneaux (Normandy) at age 42, leaving a vast production of unfinished artistic works.
