= Auriol (typeface) =

Display typeface created in 1901

- Category: display typeface
- Classification: display typeface
- Designer: George Auriol
- Foundry: G. Peignot et Fils
- Date released: 1901

Auriol is a display typeface created by George Auriol in 1901 for the G. Peignot et Fils foundry in Paris. Georges Auriol has been called the "quintessential Art Nouveau designer" according to Steven Heller and Louise Fili. The letterforms he designed for his namesake typeface originated in Française-légère and Française-allongée, two other fonts he designed for G. Peignot et Fils. All three typefaces are distinguished by brush-like, unconnected strokes influenced by Japanese calligraphy.

Auriol became a popular typeface in Europe and America in the early 20th century, and was widely used as display type in books, posters, and in the applied arts. It was also adopted for signage at Paris Metro stations. In 1979, during the revival of interest in the Art Nouveau period, Matthew Carter expanded the range of weights for Auriol by creating bold and black versions based on the original designs.

Auriol is currently a trademark of Linotype GmbH, a subsidiary of Monotype Corporation, and is registered in the U.S. Patent and Trademark Office.
