= Édouard Chimot =

Édouard Chimot (26 November 1880 – 7 June 1959) was a French artist, illustrator and editor whose career reached its peak in the 1920s in Paris, through the publication of fine quality art-printed books. As artist his own work occupies a characteristic place, but as editor also his role was extremely important in bringing together some of the outstanding talents of that distinctive period in French art and providing the commissions upon which the development of their work in a formal context occurred.

== Early career ==
Born in Lille, Chimot studied under Jean-Baptiste Levert and Alexis Mossa at the École des Arts décoratifs in Nice, and then under Pharaon de Winter at the Beaux-Arts, Lille. The course of his early career is unclear. He seems to have first exhibited in 1912, rather late at the age of 32, and perilously close to the outbreak of World War I, which was to cause a four-year hiatus in his career, so that Chimot was 39 by the time he really made his mark on the Paris art world.

It seems possible that Chimot's late start as an artist was because he initially trained as an architect – the only speculation for this is an item on the internet from Fodor's guides, which credits Chimot with the design in 1903 of the Villa Lysis in Capri, for the dissolute Baron Jacques d'Adelswärd-Fersen. He went to Paris at the start of the 20th century and tried various occupations to gain a living, while continuing to draw at night. It was at this time that he bought an etching press and taught himself printmaking, in his rare free time.

In the years before the War Chimot had an atelier in Montmartre, haunted by "jeunes et jolies femmes" who served as his models. His first exhibition of drawings, etchings, and monotypes was in 1912; this was a success, and earned him a commission to illustrate René Baudu's text Les Après-midi de Montmartre with etchings of what André Warnod termed his "petites filles perdues" (little lost girls). Then came the long interruption of the First World War, during which Chimot was mobilized for nearly five years.

== A fresh start ==
After the war, Chimot rented Renoir’s studio in the Boulevard de Rochechouart. He already had the etchings for Les Après-midi de Montmartre. These were published in 1919, followed by La Montée aux enfers and Les Soirs d’opium by Maurice Magre, Le Fou by Aurele Partorni, L’Enfer by Henri Barbusse, La Petite Jeanne pâle by Jean de Tinan, and Mouki le Delaisse by André Cuel, all illustrated with original etchings between 1920 and 1922. In 1921 Chimot also founded a magazine, La Roseraie: Revue des Arts et des Lettres, published by the printer and publisher La Roseraie under Chimot's artistic direction. This however ceased production after a single issue.

=== Devambez ===
This led to the breakthrough in Chimot's career by which he became artistic director of Les Éditions d’Art Devambez. Between 1923 and 1931, from his atelier in the rue Ampère, he oversaw the production of an array of books illustrated by such artists as Pierre Brissaud, Edgar Chahine, Alméry Lobel-Riche, and Tsuguharu Foujita. He reserved some choice texts for himself, including Les Chansons de Bilitis by Pierre Louÿs (1925), Les Belles de nuit by Magre (1927), and Parallèlement by Paul Verlaine (1931).

The crucial decade of his career was that between the end of World War I and the Wall Street crash. It was during this time of frivolity and excess that Chimot created the haunting and compelling images by which his name will endure. Not only was he editing an important list for Devambez, but he remained at the same time as director of Éditions de La Roseraie, while also pursuing his own artistic career.

In the 1920s, Chimot also made at least two films, L’Ornière (1924, also known as Micheline Horn and as Sur le Chemin de Vrai) and Survivre (date unknown). During the glittering Jazz Age, Chimot was forming not just artistic but literary alliances, with writers such as the Surrealist Gilbert Lély, who dedicated the first publication of Ne tue ton père qu’à bon escient to Chimot in 1929. On 23 October of that year, Édouard Chimot must have felt gloriously launched on his late-started career. At the age of 49, he was a significant figure in the Paris art world, a generous patron of his fellow artists, and himself an artist with a public hungry for his late-Symbolist nudes, "soumises à leurs passions mortelles et délicieuses", as André Warnod put it.

The following day came the Wall Street Crash, which wiped out the market for fancy limited editions. When the last of the books in production for Devambez, Chimot's own edition of Parallèlement, was published in 1931, the game was up. That year a monograph on Chimot by Maurice Rat was published, with a preface by Maurice Magre, in the series Les Artistes du livre, putting the full stop to the glory years of Chimot.

== Later career ==
Chimot's work in the last three decades of his life shows a sad falling-off from his pinnacle of activity and achievement in the 20s, though there are flashes of grace and brilliance. In the last year of his life appeared a collection of 16 drawings of female nudes, Les Belles que voilà: mes modèles de Montmartre à Séville, which he regarded as a summary of his lifelong devotion to the female nude. In the 1926 issue of L’Ami du Lettré (quoted by J.-L. Bernard: III), Chimot wrote,

"J’ai choisi la femme comme sujet préféré, puis unique de mon oeuvre. Je recherché un modèle au corps élegant et mince avec le côté moderne, un peu androgyne. Je fais beaucoup de dessins dans l’ambiance du texte, puis je choisis parmi eux. La gravure devient une traduction libre de mon dessin. Il me faut de deux à quatre semaines pour une gravure. Je ne fais que de l’eau-forte."

Chimot had fallen in love with Spain while researching the illustrations for his edition of La Femme et le Pantin by Pierre Louÿs in 1928. During the Second World War, he and his wife Loulou (19 years his junior) took refuge from the war in the holiday house they had bought in Barcelona. Hence Chimot's publications afterwards, appeared in Barcelona, and mostly illustrate Spanish-language texts. Chimot died in Paris in 1959.

A bibliography of Chimot's illustrated books was published in an edition of 200 copies in 1991.

== Sources ==
- Anon. 'The Work of The Maison Devambez', Commercial Art Magazine, May 1928
- J. Bailly-Herzberg, L’Estampe en France 1830-1950 (Arts et Métiers Graphiques, 1985)
- E. Bénézit, Dictionnaire critique et documentaire des Peintres, Sculpteurs, Dessinateurs et Graveurs (Gründ, 14 vols, 1999)
- J.-L. Bernard, Édouard Chimot 1880-1959: bibliographie des oeuvres illustrés. (J-L Bernard, 1991)
- [Édouard Chimot], Les Éditions d’Art Devambez (Éditions d’Art Devambez, 1929)
- Colette Giraudon, Paul Guillaume et les Peintres du XXe Siècle (La Bibliothèque des Arts, 1993)
- Paul Guillaume, 'A New Aesthetic', Les Arts à Paris, 15 mai 1919
- Luc Monod, Manuel de l’Amateur de Livres Illustrés Modernes 1875-1975 (Ides et Calendes, 1992)
- Pierre Mornand, Trente Artistes du Livre (Marval éditions, 1945)
- Pierre Mornand, Vingt-Deux Artistes du Livre (Le Courrier graphique, 1948)
- Pierre Mornand, Vingt Artistes du Livre (Le Courrier graphique, 1950)
- Marcus Osterwalder, Dictionnaire des Illustrateurs, 1800-1965 (Ides et Calendes, 3 vols, 2000)
- Maurice Rat, Édouard Chimot (Henri Babou, 1931)
- W.J. Strachan, The Artist and the Book in France (Peter Owen, 1969)
- Martin Wolpert and Jeffrey Winter, Figurative Paintings: Paris and the Modern Spirit (Schiffer, 2006)
