= Maison Devambez =

Fine printing firm in Paris, France

- Industry: Engraver, Art Edition
- Predecessor: Brasseux Jeune, Beltz
- Founded: 1826
- Founder: Édouard Devambez
- Headquarters: Paris, France
- Website: http://www.devambez.com

Maison Devambez is the name of a fine printer's firm in Paris. It operated under that name from 1873, when a printing business established by the royal engraver Hippolyte Brasseux in 1826 was acquired by Édouard Devambez. At first the firm specialized in heraldic engraving, engraved letterheads and invitations. Devambez clients included the House of Orléans, the House of Bonaparte and the Élysée Palace. Devambez widened the scope of the business to include advertising and publicity, artists’ prints, luxurious limited edition books, and an important art gallery. The House became recognized as one of the foremost fine engravers in Paris, winning numerous medals and honours. With the artist Édouard Chimot as Editor after the First World War, a series of limited edition art books, employing leading French artists, illustrators and affichistes, reached a high point under the imprimatur A l'Enseigne du Masque d'Or – the Sign of the Golden Mask and with PAN in collaboration with Paul Poiret. Édouard's son, André Devambez, became a famous painter and illustrator after receiving the Prix de Rome.

== 1826–1873: The business before Devambez ==
The engraving business acquired by Devambez just before the Franco-Prussian War was founded in 1827 at No. 17, passage des Panoramas, as a "modest store" by Brasseux the younger. He was the younger brother of Brasseux the older, an engraver established in the galleries of the Palais-Royal who was known to work for king Louis Philippe I. As his brother, Brasseux the younger was specialized in stamps, medals, heraldic engraving and stone engraving. In 1835, the business was moved to n°5 of the passage, due to the renovation of the latter. According to an article published in 1927 in L'ami des lettrés, Brasseux the younger was moderately successful in his business and did not succeed to enlarge significantly his customer base. He sold the business in 1863 to a M. Beltz. Beltz in turn sold the business who ran it for the next seven years, after which it was bought by Édouard Devambez.

Édouard Devambez was born on 11 March 1844 in Saumont-la-Poterie, Seine-Maritime. He served an apprenticeship with the prestigious engravers (and his cousins-in-law) Jules Joseph Foulonneau and Jean Henri Hillekamp at 4, Galerie Vivienne, Paris. When Édouard Devambez married Catherine Veret in 1864, he was entering the illustrious dynasty of Muret and Veret – two families prominent in engraving at the beginning of the 19th century. In 1873, Devambez acquired the atelier at 5, Passage des Panoramas, leaving his workshop of rue Saint-Thomas.

== Devambez engraver and fine printing ==
Édouard Devambez, described in Bénézit as an engraver of book-plates, began exhibiting his work at the Exposition Universelle in Paris, winning a bronze medal in 1878 and a silver medal in 1889 in the category "artistic printing and heraldic painting". Among the specialities of La Maison Devambez at this time were: book printing and production; type-founding; engraving on steel, copper, lead, wood, and stone; printing; typography; lithography; colour printing and colour lithography; calligraphy; colouring; stamping; binding; gilding; and the sale of inks, paints, journals, ledgers, papers, boxes, stationery, leather goods, and special fabrics.

In 1890, the business moved to 63, Passage des Panoramas, where what began as a simple printing studio became a prestigious store that attracted clients such as the House of Orléans, Roland Bonaparte, the Tsar Ferdinand I of Bulgaria and the Élysée Palace and the Hôtel de Ville, entrusted with the printing of official menus and programmes for receptions for visiting foreign monarchs such as the Emperor of Russia Nicholas II and the Empress Alexandra Feodorovna for their visit in Dunkerque on 18 September 1901. Devambez was also appointed official engraver to the Royal Family of Portugal. Devambez produced the traditional Livre d’Or (Golden Book, or Presentation Volume) for important events such as visits by the King of Spain or the King of Great Britain, and Livres d’Or for the Pasteur Institute, the Red Cross and others. After World War I the firm also produced Livres d’Or to commemorate the fallen, for instance the Livre d’Or de la Compagnie Algérienne 1914-1918.

The reputation of La Maison Devambez continued to grow, with further medals at the Expositions Universelles, with a gold medal at Brussels in 1897, a Diploma of Honour at Toronto in 1898, and a gold medal in the category "engraving and printing" at the Exposition Universelle de Paris in 1900. At this exhibition (for which Édouard Devambez served as a member of the jury), he was named a Chevalier de la Légion d’honneur, and also obtained the prestigious title of Notable Commerçant.

M. Lahure, reporting on the 1900 Exposition, wrote:

'Monsieur Devambez, with the soul of an artist, loves his art with a passion, but this has not hampered him in making the House of Devambez one of the foremost engravers in Paris. His whole exhibit shows so artistic a taste and so meticulous an execution that the reputation acquired by M. Devambez would have grown even more, if that had been possible.'"

The expansion of the business so far beyond its original boundaries necessitated an expansion of the premises. Rather than moving out of the Passage des Panoramas, where his main rival Stern was also located, Devambez took over two further adjacent shops.

Édouard Devambez died on 2 June 1923.

== Galerie Devambez ==
The Galerie Devambez was opened at 43, Boulevard Malesherbes in 1897. Initially it was used purely as a sales outlet for original prints – lithographs, etchings, drypoints – and facsimile prints of watercolours. During the First World War the Galerie was used by the Louvre (which was closed) to sell prints created by the Chalcographie du Louvre.

The first Catalogue d’Estampes d’Art, Éditions de Grand Luxe de la Galerie Devambez lists limited edition prints by the following artists: Adler, Baudoux, Berthoud, Boichard, Brouet, Bernard Boutet de Monvel, Bucci, G. Cain, H. Chabanian, G. Charpentier, Damman, Désiré Lucas, Mme Destailleurs-Sevrin, Caro Delvaille, André Devambez, Duchemin, Adrien Étienne [Drian], Fraipont, Pennequin, Albert Guillaume, Labrouche, Herbeaud, J. B. Huet, Maurice Leloir, Lesage, Lorrain, R. Lorrain, Mignot, Mordant, Maurice Neumont, Gabriel Nicolet, Plasse, Richard Ranft, Rochegrosse. Simont, Maurice Taquoy, Raymond Woog, Waidmann. Devambez also published limited edition albums of prints by artists such as Guy Arnoux (for instance Tambours et Trompettes, a set of 10 pochoir prints published in 1918).

No complete list exists of exhibitions held at the Galerie Devambez between 1908 and 1931. However catalogues of many of the shows are in the library of the Musée des Arts Décoratifs in Paris. Pierre Sanchez has published in 2009 a book on the shows and artists of the gallery.

The first exhibition at Galerie Devambez was a major show of drawings by Auguste Rodin, exhibited from 19 October to 5 November 1908.

The Rodin show caused shock and outrage because of the erotic nature of many of the drawings. The sculptor F. W. Ruckstull was horrified, writing disapprovingly: ‘In his exhibition of drawings, held on 19 October 1908 in the Galerie Devambez in Paris, he showed the most libidinous set of drawings ever exposed to an invited public, in which there were at least two that were frankly pornographic and for which show he was, by both French and foreign people, called "beast", "monster", "vulgar charlatan", "sadist." etc.’

Others were charmed and delighted by the freshness of Rodin's work. The foreword to the catalogue praised the ‘bold, truthful images’, while the critic of Le Journal wrote that, ‘One cannot find in these hundred and fifty sketches and drawings of Rodin a single note seen before.’

This set the tone for a glittering series of important exhibitions, such as the Première Exposition d’Art Nègre et d’Art Océanien, organized by Paul Guillaume, 13–19 May 1919, with a catalogue by Henri Clouzot and additional text by Guillaume Apollinaire. Apollinaire, who died the previous year, had collaborated with Paul Guillaume on the pioneering study Sculptures Nègres in 1917. This exhibition – drawn from Guillaume's private collection – placed African art at the heart of Modernism. Artists exhibiting at Galerie Devambez included Mary Cassatt, Armand Guillaumin, Claude-Oscar Monet, Pierre-Auguste Renoir, Auguste Marquet, Paul Signac, Raoul Dufy, Maurice de Vlaminck, Henri Matisse, Georges Braque, Pablo Picasso, Amedeo Modigliani, Tsuguharu Foujita, and Giorgio de Chirico.

The Exposition de Peinture Moderne organised by M. Paul Guillaume in the Galerie Devambez from 27 January to 12 February 1920 with an introductory text by Guillaume Apollinaire is considered as a turning point in the modern art history. Picasso exhibited four works : Tête, Buste, Nature Morte, and Nu de Femme. Modigliani exhibited twelve : La Demoiselle du dimanche, Portrait de Jean Cocteau, La Dame au médaillon, La Collerette blanche, La jolie Fille rousse, Le Liseré noir, Madam Pompadour, Femme au fauteuil, Beatrice, L’Enfant gras, La Rouqine, Tête de Femme, and Raymond. Matisse exhibited one painting, Les Trois sœurs, and four bronze sculptures : Le Serf, Femme accroupie, Tête de femme, and Torse de fillette. Giorgio de Chirico's important painting Il Ritornante, also exhibited at this show, sold from the collection of Pierre Bergé – Yves Saint Laurent at Christie's in February 2009 for €11,041,00 ($14,285,461).

The catalogue text by Apollinaire reads :

Les grands poètes et les grands artistes ont pour fonction de renouveler sans cesse l'apparence que revêt la nature aux yeux des hommes. Sans les poètes, sans les artistes les hommes s'ennuieraient vite de la monotonie naturelle. L'idée sublime qu'ils ont de l'univers retomberait avec une vitesse vertigineuse. L'ordre qui paraît dans la nature et qui n'est qu'un effet de l'art s'évanouirait aussitôt. Tout se déferait dans le chaos. Plus de saison, plus de vie même et l'impuissante obscurité règnerait à jamais. Les poètes et les artistes déterminent de concert la figure de leur époque et docilement l'avenir se range à leur avis.

(Great poets and great artists have the role of renewing ceaselessly the appearance with which the world is invested in the eyes of mankind. Without poets and without artists, men would swiftly become bored by the monotony of natural order. The sublime concept of the Universe which they have would collapse with headlong suddenness. The order which seems to exist in nature, and which is merely an effect of art, would simultaneously evaporate. Everything would be dissolved in chaos. No more seasons, no more life even, and impotent darkness would reign for all time. Poets and artists together define the character of their age, and what is to come pliantly disposes itself according to their precepts.)

Together, these two important exhibitions curated by Paul Guillaume redefined the spirit and direction of Modernist art in the aftermath of World War I.

The gallery also hosted annual exhibitions of the Salon de l’Araignée, the Société des Peintres-Graveurs, and the Société des Peintres Lithographes.

== Devambez publishing ==
Long-established as a printer, Devambez only ventured into book publishing at the start of the twentieth century, the first being in 1908, a book by Georges Cain on La Place Vendôme. The publishing business was carried out from premises at 23, rue Lavoisier. Books were published either simply under the name Devambez, as Devambez Éditions de Luxe, or as À l’Enseigne du Masque d’Or, Devambez; the term Masque d’Or was also used for two beautiful Art Deco almanacks for the years 1921 and 1922, illustrated with pochoir prints by Édouard Halouze.

In this capacity, between 1906 and 1932 Devambez published around 70 general books, mostly illustrated, of which a selection of key titles is listed below.

- Georges Cain, La Place Vendôme, 1908
- Eugène Belville, Monogrammes, Cachets, Marques, Ex-Libris, 1910
- Léon Bourgeois et al., La Misère Sociale de la Femme, 1910
- René Peter, La Création du Monde, ill. René Peter, 1912
- A. Bernheim, Autour de la Comédie Française, 1913
- Jacques Boulanger, Le plus rare Voscelett du Monde, ill. Pierre Brissaud, 1913
- Charles Fouqueray, Le Front de Mer, ill. Charles Fouqueray, [1916]
- Charles Fouqueray, Les Fusiliers-Marins au Front de Flandres, ill. Charles Fouqueray, [1916]
- René Benjamin, Les Soldats de la Guerre, Gaspard, ill. Jean Lefort, 1917
- Guy Arnoux. "Le Bon Francais" 1917.
- Louis Raemaekers, La Guerre, ill. Louis Raemaekers, [1917]
- Roger Boutet de Monvel, Nos Frères d’Amérique, ill. Guy Arnoux, 1918
- Lucien Lévy-Dhurmer, Les Mères pendant la Guerre, ill. Lucien Lévy-Dhurmer, 1918
- Georges-Victor Hugo, Sur le Front de Champagne, ill. Georges-Victor Hugo, 1918
- Guy Arnoux, Histoire de la Ramée, ill. Guy Arnoux, 1919
- Jean-Paul Alaux, Visions Japonaises, ill. Jean-Paul Alaux, 1920
- Almanach du Masque d’Or pour l’année 1921, ill. Édouard Halouze, 1920
- Guy Arnoux, Les Caractères, ill. Guy Arnoux, [1920]
- Jacques Boulanger, De la Valse au Tango, ill. Cappiello, Sem, Drian, Domergue, Guy Arnoux, De Goyon, Halouze, 1920
- Marc Elder, À Bord des Chalutiers Dragueurs de Mines, ill. René Pinard, 1920
- Claude Farrère, Vieille Marine, ill. Guy Arnoux, 1920
- René Kerdyk, Les Femmes de ce Temps, ill. Guy Arnoux, 1920
- Edgar Allan Poe, Une Descente dans le Maelström, ill. Marc Roux, 1920
- Madeleine de Scudéry, La Promenade de Versailles, ill. Robert Mahias, 1920
- Laurence Sterne, Voyage Sentimental en France et en Italie, ill. Édouard Halouze, 1920
- Almanach du Masque d’Or pour l’année 1922, ill. Édouard Halouze, 1921
- Léon Arnoult, La Variabilité du Gout dans les Arts, 1921
- Jean de la Fontaine, Adonis, intro. Paul Valéry, 1921
- Prosper Mérimée, La Double Méprise, 1922
- Jean-Paul Alaux, L’Histoire Merveilleuse de Christophe Colomb, ill. Gustave Alaux, 1924
- Georges-Marie Haardt and Louis Adouin-Dubreuil, Les Nuits du Hoggar: Poèmes Touareg, ill. Galanis after Robert-Raphaël Hardt, 1926
- Adolphe Willette, Les Sept Péchés Capitaux, ill. Adolphe Willette, 1926
- Les Arcades des Champs-Élysées, Une Merveille du Paris Moderne, ill. Raoul Serres and Lauro, 1927
- Guy Arnoux, Chansons du Marin Français, ill. Guy Arnoux, 1928
- Cherronet, Jean Cocteau, Corbière, Dekobra, Etchegouin, Fouquières, Mac Orlan, and Edmond Rostand, Deauville, La Plage Fleurie, ill. Angoletta, Boucher, Dubaut, Gallibert, Geo Ham, Sem, Valerio, Vertès, 1930
- Pierre Mac Orlan, La Croix, L’Ancre et la Grenade, ill. Lucien Boucher, 1932

== Édouard Chimot and Les Editions d'Art Devambez ==
The books listed above do not include those published from 1923 to 1931 under the name Éditions d’Art Devambez, which was a separate series of artist's books.

The appointment of Édouard Chimot in 1923 as artistic director of a fine press imprint, Les Éditions d’Art Devambez, opened a new era for Devambez. Chimot was among the artists who carried the Symbolist aesthetic forward into the age of Art Deco. The 1920s were his heyday. This was when his own art was at its most powerful and original, and also when his influence throughout the Parisian art world was most strongly felt. As artistic director of the fine press Les Éditions d’Art Devambez, Édouard Chimot worked closely with artists such as Pierre Brissaud, Edgar Chahine, Tsuguharu Foujita, Drian, Jean Droit, Henri Farge, and Alméry Lobel-Riche. Typically, books published by André Devambez under the direction of Chimot were illustrated with original etchings, in strictly limited editions of a few hundred copies.

In 1929, Devambez published a lavish catalogue, simply entitled Les Éditions d’Art Devambez, in an edition of 100, to be given to his chief collaborators and preferred clients, containing extra proofs from all the books published from 1923 to 1929. Each copy of this catalogue was numbered and signed by Chimot to a named recipient. As almost all the books are already listed as out-of-print and unobtainable, the catalogue is not a sales pitch, but a record of achievement. To make the 100 books, the publisher bound up existing proof pages, to distribute to those most interested:

'Ce n’est pas un catalogue de reproductions que nous lui offrons, mais les précieux défets des livres eux-mêmes: les eaux-fortes du tirage et les feuilles typographiques du tirage, imprimées sur les différents papiers employés pour chaque édition.'

In order to construct a catalogue in this way, all copies of the book must be unique in their content.

Devambez may have regretted the extra expense involved in creating this exquisite calling card, as the Wall Street crash and subsequent Depression devastated his market. No one would be buying, or bankrolling, projects such as these in the 1930s. There were several books still in the pipeline, but the glory days of the Chimot/Devambez partnership were over. Some announced books seem to have been cancelled.

The artists involved in Les Éditions d’Art Devambez include Art Deco masters such as Pierre Brissaud (who illustrated three books of the 31 or 32 published) and Drian. Drian was born Adrien Desiré Étienne, into a peasant family in Lorraine. The chatelaine of the village took an interest in the talented boy, but was horrified by his desire to be an artist. So when Adrien Étienne went to Paris to study at the Académie Julian, he took the pseudonym Drian – his own first name, as his contemporaries heard it in his slurred Lorrain accent. He is often listed as Adrien Drian or Étienne Drian, but both are incorrect: the name Drian stands alone, like Erté.

Chimot drew from the wide range of artists from round the world who had settled in Paris in the 1920s : William Walcot was an English artist born in Odessa to a Russian mother; Edgar Chahine and Tigrat Polane were both Armenian émigrés; Tsuguharu Foujita, known to his Montmartre friends as Léonard, was the artist who more than any other infused Japanese art with a modern Western sensibility.

Édouard Chimot himself was the most prolific supplier of original prints to Les Éditions d’Art Devambez, illustrating with etchings Les Chansons du Bilitis, Les Poésies de Méléagre, Les Belles de Nuit, La Femme et le Pantin, and Verlaine's Parallèlement.

=== List of books published under the imprint Les Éditions d’Art Devambez ===
(See References for sources of this listing.)

- Anatole France, Le Petit Pierre, ill. Pierre Brissaud, 1923
- Anatole France, La Vie en Fleur, ill. Pierre Brissaud, 1924
- Henri de Regnier, La Canne de Jaspe, ill. Drian, 1924
- Pierre Louÿs, Les Chansons de Bilitis, ill, Édouard Chimot, 1925
- Maurice Barrès, La Mort de Vénise, ill. Edgar Chahine, 1926
- Claude Farrère, L’Homme qui Assassina, ill. Henri Farge, 1926
- Gustave Flaubert, Salammbô, ill. William Walcot, 1926
- Pierre Loti, La Troisième Jeunesse de Madame Prune, ill. Tsuguharu Foujita, 1926
- Pierre Louÿs, Les Poésies de Méléagre, ill. Édouard Chimot, 1926
- Alphonse Daudet, Les Lettres de mon Moulin, ill. Jean Droit, 1927
- Joseph Arthur, Comte de Gobineau, Les Nouvelles Asiatiques, ill. Henri Le Riche, 1927
- Jean Lorrain, Monsieur de Bougrelon, ill, Drian, 1927
- Maurice Magre, Les Belles de Nuit, ill. Édouard Chimot, 1927
- André Suarès, Le Livre de L’Émeraude, ill. Auguste Brouet, 1927
- Maurice Barrès, Greco ou le secret de Tolède, ill. Auguste Brouet, 1928
- Alphonse Daudet, Les Contes du Lundi, ill. Pierre Brissaud, 1928
- Gustave Flaubert, Hérodias, ill. William Walcot, 1928
- Pierre Louÿs, La Femme et le Pantin, ill. Édouard Chimot, 1928
- Alphonse de Chateaubriant, Monsieur de Lourdines, ill. Henri Jourdain, 1929
- Gustave Flaubert, Novembre, ill. Edgar Chahine, 1929
- Joris-Karl Huysmans, Le Drageoir aux Épices, ill. Auguste Brouet, 1929
- Marie-Madeleine Pioche de La Vergne, Comtesse de Lafayette, La Princesse de Clèves, ill. Drian, 1929
- Alfred de Musset, La Nuit Vénitienne, ill. Jean-Gabriel Domergue, 1929
- Émile Verhaeren, Les Villages Illusoires, ill. J. van Santen, 1929
- René Boylesve, Nymphes dansant avec des Satyres, ill. Tigrane Polat, 1930
- Colette, Mitsou, ill. Edgar Chahine, 1930
- Ovid, Métamorphoses, ill. André Lambert, 1930
- André Suarès, Le Voyage du Condottière, ill. Louis Jou, 1930
- Oscar Wilde, Salomé, ill. Alméry Lobel-Riche, 1930
- Joris-Karl Huysmans, Marthe, ill. Auguste Brouet, 1931
- Paul Verlaine, Parallèlement, ill. Édouard Chimot, 1931

There appears to be one further volume published as part of the same series as those above, but not included in the published catalogue, perhaps because it was deemed too risqué:

- Petite Mythologie Galante à l'usage des Dames, Les Dieux Majeurs, ill. André Lambert, 1928

Three books announced for 1930 may never have been printed. These were:

- Anatole France, Crainquebille, ill. Auguste Brouet
- Stéphane Mallarmé, Poésies, ill. Édouard Chimot
- Albert Samain, Le Jardin de l’Infante, ill. Édouard Chimot

== Devambez and advertising ==
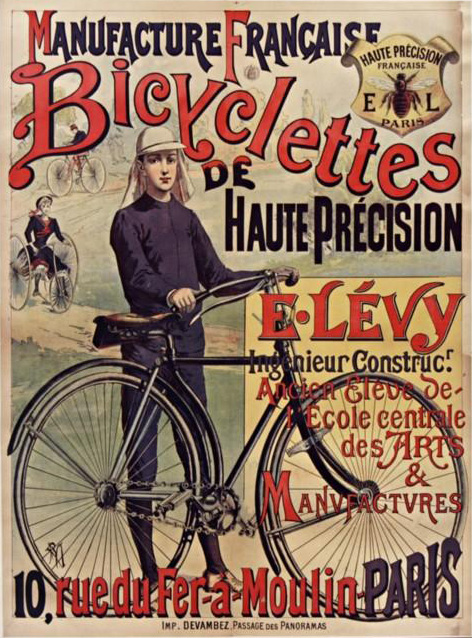
Poster for a bicycle manufacturer printed by Devambez in 1890

Devambez was a pioneering advertising agency. They produced posters, catalogues (for instance a catalogue for Chrysler designed by Valerio), and adverts. An article in the Commercial Art Magazine in May 1928 notes that Devambez had already discovered the secrets of creating a brand: "In direct advertising he devotes particular attention to arousing the interest of possible buyers by objects which are not specific advertisements, but create a favourable disposition towards the advertiser on whose behalf they are produced.'

During the First World War, Devambez created many posters for the Bureau de Propagande Française à l’Étranger, by artists such as Abel Faivre, André Devambez, Théophile-Alexandre Steinlen, Adolphe Willette, and Jean-Louis Forain.

From 1921 to 1936 Devambez had an exclusive contract with one of the leading poster artists of the day, Leonetto Cappiello. His most famous posters are for Parapluies Revel, La Belle Jardinière, Cachou Lajaunie, Bouillons Kub, and Le Théâtre National de l’Opéra. Other artists who frequently created posters for Devambez include Lucien Boucher, Roger de Valerio, and Victor Vasarely.

Devambez also produced books for clients such as railway and shipping companies. These luxurious productions were not for sale, but were given away as promotional items. One typical item, an Art Deco-style guide to fashionable Paris complete with a "List of firms recommended", was published for the French State Railways. Written in English by Jacques Deval, it mimics the style of Anita Loos’ Gentlemen Prefer Blondes. The title is ...and blondes prefer Paris. Four letters, twenty-two postcards, two night letters and one cable from his sweet, sweet Annabel Flowers to her darling, darling, George Sabran.

== PAN, Annuaire du Luxe à Paris, Paul Poiret ==
La Maison Devambez became intimately connected with the other grand houses of fashionable Paris. The 1927 book Les Arcades des Champs Élysées celebrated the achievement of the architect Marcel Duhayon. Marcel Duhayon designed luxury hotels in Paris : Hotel Royal Monceau, Hotel Commodore, Hotel California, Grand Hotel des Ambassadeurs. He was the uncle of Suzanne Goyard, the wife of François Goyard, the grand-grand son of the founder of Goyard, the Parisian trunk maker founded in 1853. The luxury shops of the day were celebrated in the pochoir illustrations by Édouard Halouze in the Almanach du Masque d’Or, in 16 pages of adverts at the back for shops such as Cartier. Companies such as Moët et Chandon joined Jeanne Lanvin, Transatlantic shipping lines and French railway companies in commissioning promotional literature from Devambez.

Most crucial of all these contacts was with the fashion designer Paul Poiret. In 1928, Poiret and Devambez collaborated on the most luxurious all the de-luxe Devambez books, entitled Pan: Annuaire de Luxe à Paris. It was essentially a collection of 116 Art Deco plates – some pochoir-coloured – advertising all the most exclusive Paris brands, including Van Cleef & Arpels, Judith Barbier, Mitsubishi, Maigret, Hermès, Lanvin, Callot Soeurs, Maxims, Galeries Lafayette, Jane Régay, Les gants Jouvin, La Tour d'Argent, Madeleine Vionnet, Worth, Moulin Rouge, and Devambez themselves.

The illustrators included Gus Bofa (Madeleine Vionnet), Lucien Boucher (Au Printemps), Raoul Dufy (La Baule), Charles Martin (Simon), Sem (Maxim's), and Roger de Valerio (Devambez).

== Sources ==
- Anon. "The Work of The Maison Devambez", Commercial Art Magazine, May 1928
- Guillaume Apollinaire, Apollinaire on Art: Essays and Reviews 1902-1918 (MFA Publications, 2001)
- Janine Bailly-Herzberg, L’Estampe en France 1830-1950 (Arts et Métiers Graphiques, 1985)
- E. Bénézit, Dictionnaire critique et documentaire des Peintres, Sculpteurs, Dessinateurs et Graveurs (Gründ, 14 vols, 1999)
- J.-L. Bernard, Édouard Chimot 1880-1959: bibliographie des oeuvres illustrés, 1991
- Édouard Chimot, Les Éditions d’Art Devambez (Éditions d’Art Devambez, 1929)
- Colette Giraudon, Paul Guillaume et les Peintres du XXe Siècle (La Bibliothèque des Arts, 1993)
- Paul Guillaume, "A New Aesthetic", Les Arts à Paris, 15 mai 1919
- Sieglinde Lemke, Primitive Modernism: Black Culture and the Origins of Transatlantic Modernism (Oxford University Press, 1998)
- Luc Monod, Manuel de l’Amateur de Livres Illustrés Modernes 1875-1975 (Ides et Calendes, 1992)
- Pierre Mornand, Trente Artistes du Livre (Éditions Marval, 1945)
- Pierre Mornand, Vingt-Deux Artistes du Livre (Le Courrier graphique, 1948)
- Pierre Mornand, Vingt Artistes du Livre (Le Courrier graphique, 1950)
- Marcus Osterwalder, Dictionnaire des Illustrateurs, 1800-1965 (Ides et Calendes, 3 vols, 2000)
- Maurice Rat, Édouard Chimot (Henri Babou, 1931)
- W. J. Strachan, The Artist and the Book in France (Peter Owen, 1969)
- Martin Wolpert & Jeffrey Winter, Figurative Paintings: Paris and the Modern Spirit (Schiffer, 2006)
