= Magre (surname) =

Magre is a surname. Notable people with the surname include:

- Judith Magre (born 1926), French actress
- Maurice Magre (1877–1941), French writer, poet, and playwright
