= Gustave Geffroy =

French journalist and author (1855–1926)

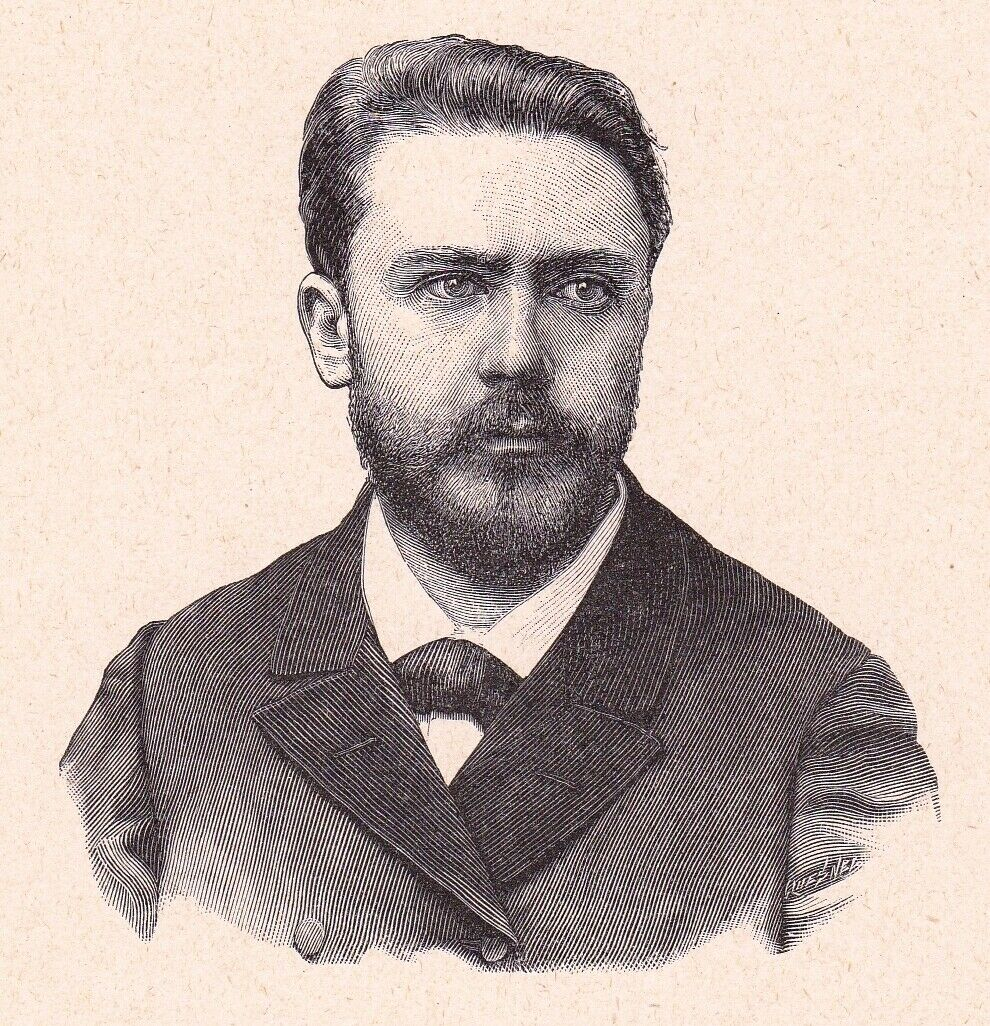
Gustave Geffroy c. 1900

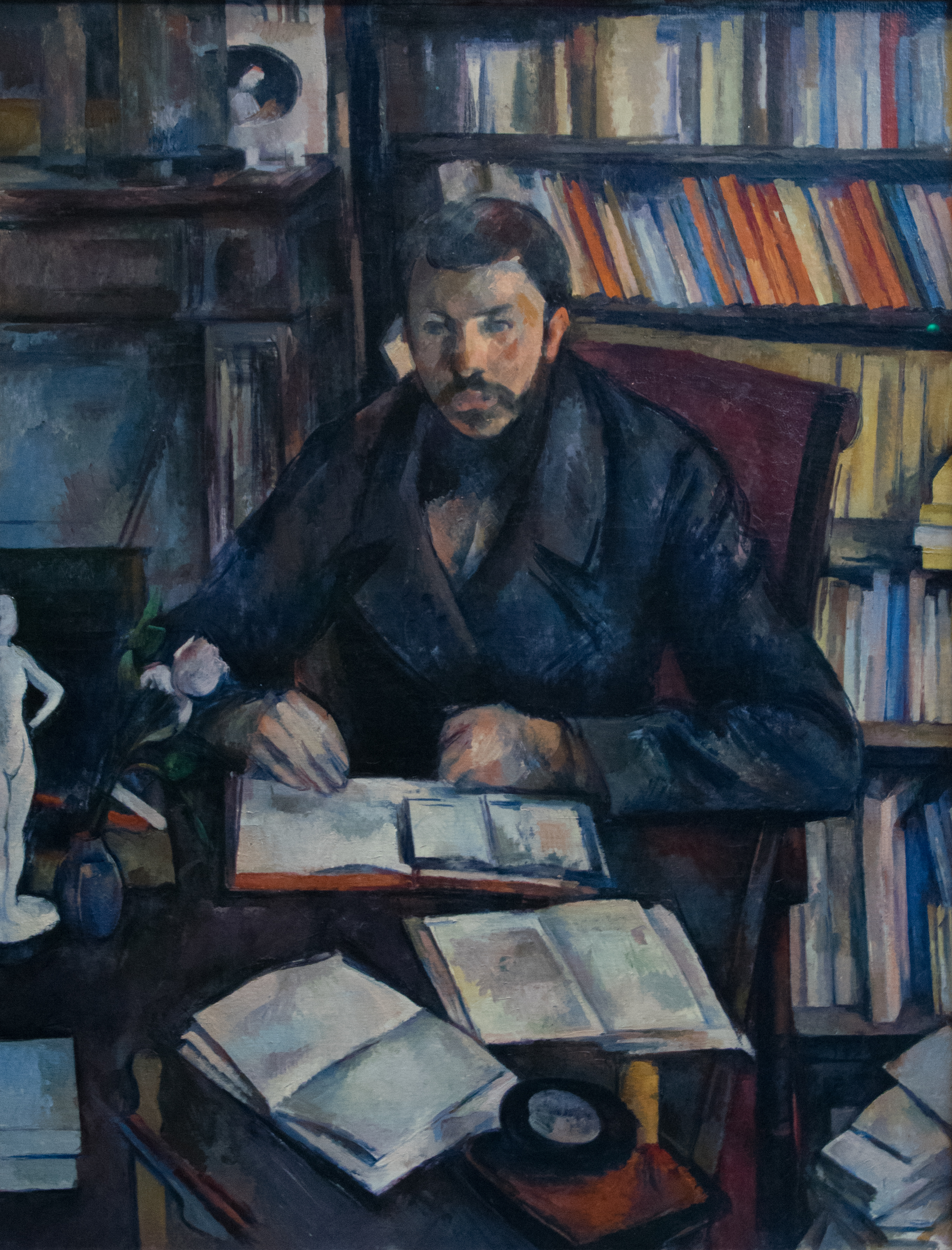
Paul Cézanne, Portrait of Gustave Geffroy, 1895. Oil on canvas, 110 × 89 cm. Musée d'Orsay, Paris

Gustave Geffroy (French pronunciation: [ɡystav ʒɛfʁwa]; 1 June 1855 – 4 April 1926) was a French journalist, art critic, historian and novelist. He was one of the ten founding members of the literary organisation Académie Goncourt in 1900.

Geffroy is noted as one of the first historians of the Impressionist art movement with his publication of Histoire de l'impressionnisme in 1892. He knew and championed Monet, whom he met in 1886 in Belle-Île-en-Mer while travelling for research on prisons of the Second Empire. Monet introduced him to Cézanne, who painted his portrait in 1895.

He contributed to the newspaper La Justice from 15 January 1880, and came to know its founder, Georges Clemenceau, who in 1908 appointed him director of the Gobelins tapestry factory, a position he held until his death.

Geffroy was born and died in Paris; he is interred at the Cimetière de Montrouge. A street in Paris's 13th arrondissement, close to the Gobelins Manufactory, bears his name.

== Principal works ==
Novels

- Le Cœur et l'esprit (1894)
- L'apprentie (1904)
- Hermine Gilquin (1907)
- La Comédie bourgeoise (1922)
- Cécile Pommier. (1) L'Éducation spirituelle (2) La Lutte des classes (2 volumes, 1923)

Fine arts

- Bernard Palissy (1881)
- Le Statuaire Rodin (1889)
- La Vie artistique (8 volumes, 1892–1903)
- Rubens (1902)
- Les Musées d'Europe (11 volumes, 1906–1908)
- Claude Monet (1920)
- René Lalique (1922)
- Sisley (1923)
- preface to Auguste Brouet : catalogue de son œuvre gravé (2 volumes, 1923), a catalog of the etched work of Auguste Brouet
- Charles Meryon (1926)
- Corot
- Daumier

History

- Histoire de l'impressionnisme (1892)
- L'Enfermé (1897)
- La Bretagne (1905)
- Clemenceau (1918)
- Constantin Guys, l'historien du Second Empire (1920)

Other

- Notes d'un journaliste: vie, littérature, théâtre (1887)
- Pays d'Ouest (1897)
- Les Minutes parisiennes, 2 heures. La Cité et l'île Saint-Louis (1899)
- L'Apprentie, historical drama in 4 acts, Paris, Théâtre de l'Odéon, 7 January 1908
- Les Bateaux de Paris (1903)
- Les Minutes parisiennes. 7 heures. Belleville (1903)
- Images du jour et de la nuit (1924)
