= Auguste Brouet =

French etcher and book illustrator

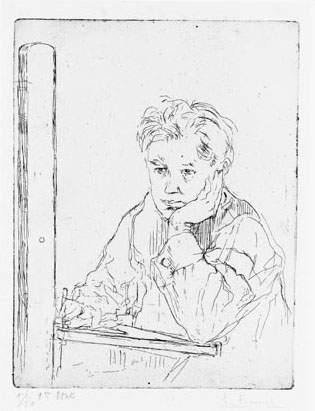
- Born: 10 October 1872; Paris, French Third Republic
- Died: 8 November 1941 (aged 69); Paris, German military administration in occupied France during World War II
- Known for: Etching

Auguste Brouet (1872–1941) was a French etcher and book illustrator.

== Biography ==
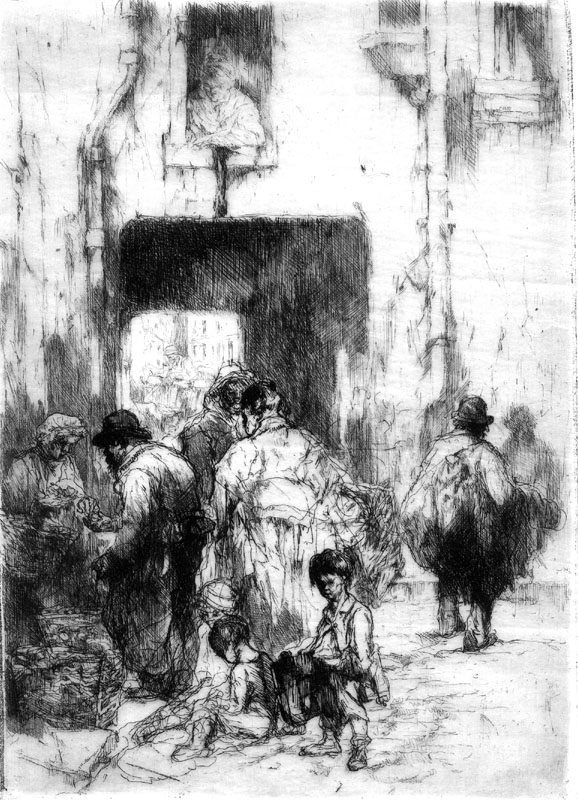
Cour à Clichy (etching, 1910)

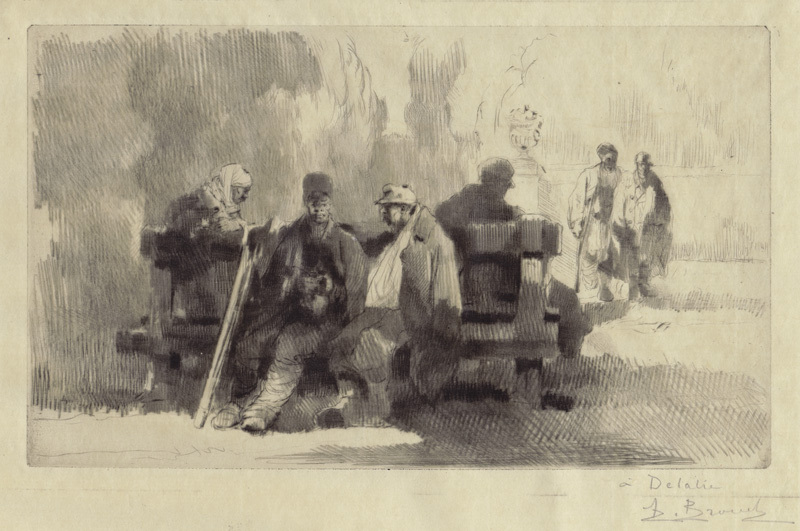
Les blessés - Parc de Saint-Cloud (etching, 1915)

Auguste Brouet was born and raised in a poor family in the popular north-east quarters of Paris and in Les Lilas, in the near suburbs. While apprenticed to a lithographer, he struggled for artistic education through the evening drawing classes of Eugène Quignolot (Dijon, 1847- Jouarre, 1921), also briefly attending Gustave Moreau's atelier. Starting from around 1895 he would make a living by doing hack work for fashionable artists and also crafting reproductive etchings in color, in the workshop of Eugène Delâtre.. Around 1902 he started to devise original etchings, sometimes larger pieces in color, more often smaller works in black and white, as was the growing trend at the time.

In the 1920s, his etchings came under strong demand both in France and in the United States, in the wake of the Print Revival. At that time, he also produced a significant body of book-illustrations, most notably for Devambez, under the direction of Edouard Chimot. This period of prosperity ends with the Great Depression, from which the print market never quite recovered. Brouet died in 1941 in poverty.

== Style ==
The art of Auguste Brouet belongs to the classical tradition. Brouet remained almost completely impervious to the modernist trends developing at the time. There are two characteristics which make a Brouet etching unmistakable:

- a certain expressive looseness of the drawing, which in his best work blends magnificently with his use of light and shades
- a very keen and sympathetic eye for all the lower social categories, their daily activities and shabby surroundings. Even his war subjects display this inner restraint and brooding mood which are so distinctive of his work.

As to books, he devised illustrations for a dozen volumes. Not surprisingly he came out at his best with texts inspired by Naturalism, such as Edmond de Goncourt's novel Les Frères Zemganno or Joris-Karl Huysmans's collection of short stories Le Drageoir aux Epices.

== Catalogs ==
His work is listed in:

- the catalog of the Bonabeau collection, with most of Brouet's production of original etchings until 1923.
- the catalog of the collection of the Bibliothèque Nationale de France.
- a searchable online catalogue of Brouet's original etchings, excluding colour etchings and illustrations.

== Bibliography ==
- Bergquist, Stephen A. "The Musical Paris of Auguste Brouet", Music in Art: International Journal for Music Iconography XLIII/1-2 (2018), 67–85.
