= Portrait of Gustave Geffroy =

Painting by Paul Cézanne

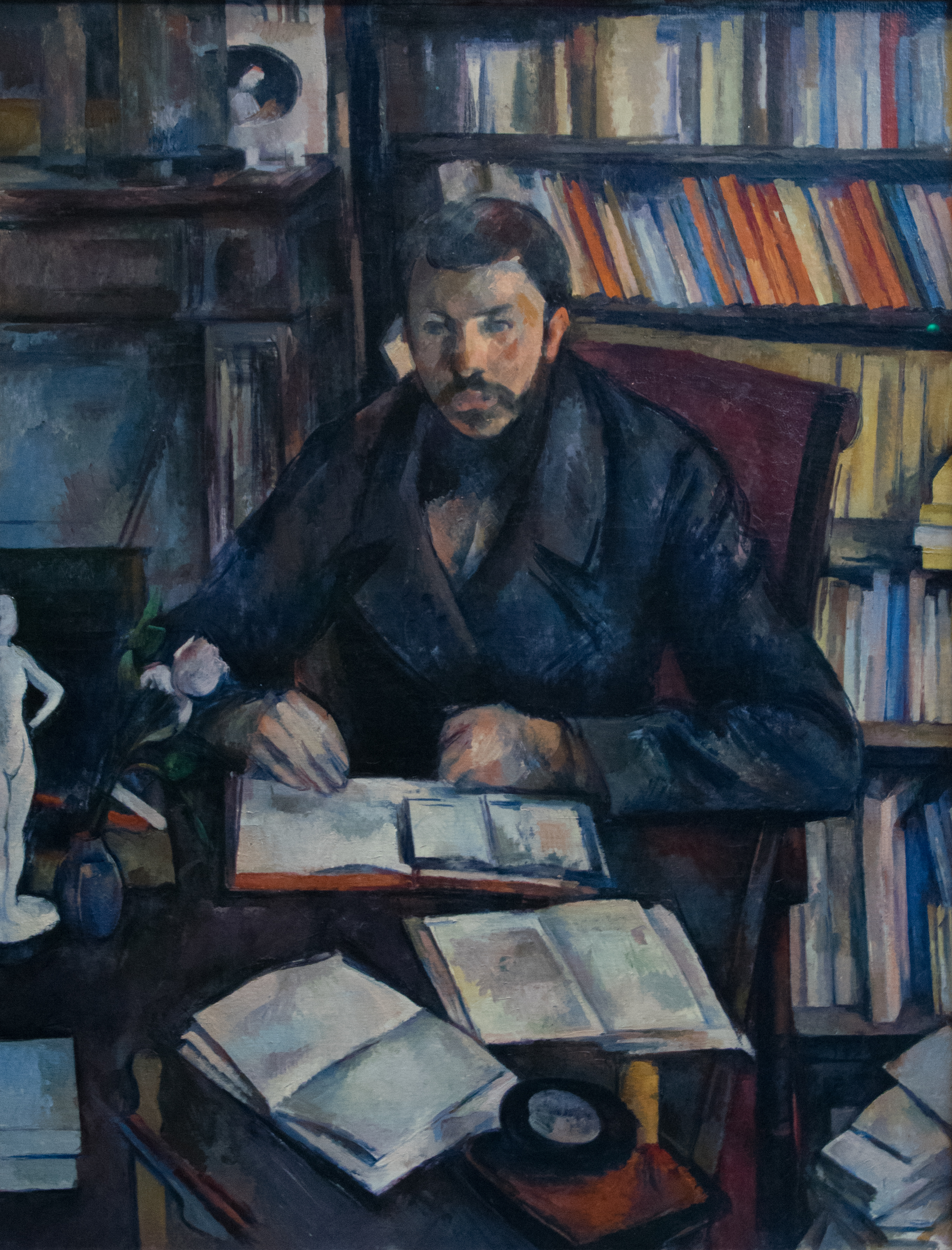
- Artist: Paul Cézanne
- Year: 1895
- Medium: Oil on canvas
- Dimensions: 110 cm × 89 cm (43 in × 35 in)
- Location: Musée d'Orsay, Paris

Portrait of Gustave Geffroy is an oil on canvas painting by the French artist Paul Cézanne, from 1895. It portrays Gustave Geffroy, a French novelist and art critic noted as one of the earliest historians of Impressionism.

== Background ==
In March 1894, Geffroy wrote a sympathetic article in the periodical Le Journal praising the work of painter Paul Cézanne who until then had received little praise in critical circles. Mutual friend Claude Monet arranged for a meeting between the two in November of that year which ended abruptly due to Cézanne's oft-noted erratic behavior. Nonetheless, Geffroy continued to write favorably of Cézanne, believing, "He is a great teller of truth. Passionate and candid, silent and subtle, he will go to The Louvre." Cézanne expressed thanks in letters to Geffroy in the months following their meeting and, in a display of gratitude (and possible feeling that Geffroy understood him), he elected to paint Geffroy's portrait.

== Subject's response ==
The painter sent the critic a request in April 1895, after which Geffroy sat for Cézanne daily over a span of three months in the study at his home in Paris. After the three months' time, Cézanne, disappointed with the portrait's results, fled both the painting and Paris itself for his home in Aix-en-Provence. In a July 6 letter to Monet, he explained, "I am a little upset at the meager result I obtained, especially after so many sittings and successive bursts of enthusiasm and despair." It has also been speculated that, despite his words of gratitude in the same letter to Monet noting Geffroy's patience over the three-month span, the artist had built up feelings of resentment, even hostility, toward the critic, causing his abandonment of the project for seclusion in Aix. Reasons for the breakdown in relations on Cézanne's part have been attributed to everything from politics to artistic principles to religion.

== Legacy ==
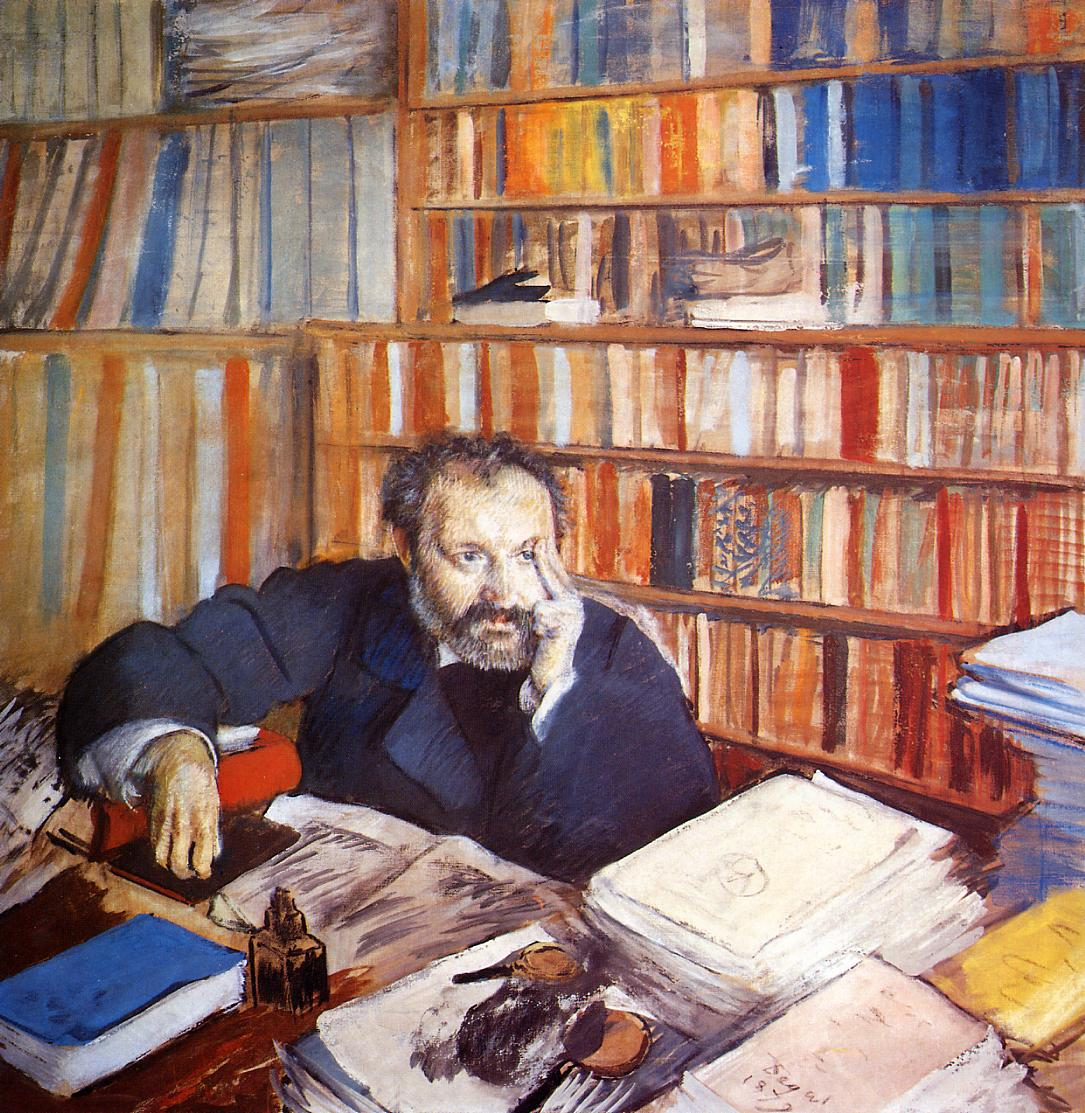
Edgar Degas: Portrait of Duranty, 1879 Oil on canvas, 100.6 x 100.6 cm Burrell Collection, Glasgow

Cézanne was unhappy with the painting and it was never finished, yet Portrait of Gustave Geffroy became a popular retrospective work after his death. Cubist painters were interested in the geometrical dimensions of the bookcase and perspective of vast table space in relation to the rest of the pictorial space. Geffroy noted that Cézanne painted the entire canvas at once, leaving the face and hands for last; they were ultimately unfinished. The portrait has been described as angular, with the figure of Geffroy centered as a pyramidal or triangular figure, and surrounded by shelves, books and figurines complementing and converging on top of his profile. The multiple angles of perspective, particularly with the books both in cases and on the table, have been noted for their "zig-zag" effect on the viewer, creating movement within the painting.

The portrait has been noted as the continuation of a recurring Cézanne theme: people in their natural environment, reserved and unimposing, immersed in their everyday tasks. It has also been compared to the earlier Portrait of Duranty by Edgar Degas, from which critics have speculated Cézanne drew inspiration.

The painting was donated to the French state in 1969 by the family of collector Auguste Pellerin and is on permanent display at the Musée d'Orsay in Paris.

== See also ==
- List of paintings by Paul Cézanne

== Sources ==
- Howard, Michael. Cézanne. New York: Gallery Books, 1990. ISBN 0-8317-2827-2
- Murphy, Richard W. The World of Cézanne. New York: Time-Life Books, 1968.
- Newton, Joy. Cézanne's Literary Incarnations. French Studies: A Quarterly Review 61.1, 2007. 36-46.
- Schapiro, Meyer. Cézanne. New York: Harry N. Abrams, 1988. ISBN 0-8109-1043-8
- Wadley, Nicholas. Cézanne and his art. New York: Galahad, 1975. ISBN 0-88365-248-X
