= Alméry Lobel-Riche =

French artist (1877–1950)

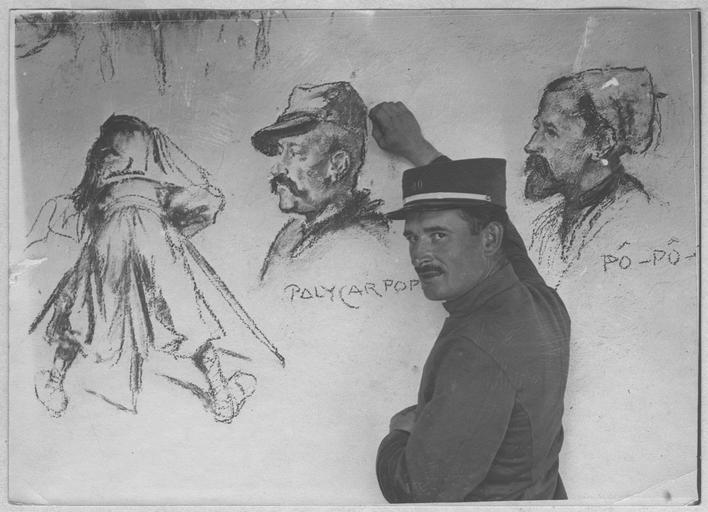
Alméry Lobel-Riche Thessaloniki, Greece, 1916

Alméry Lobel-Riche (born Alméric Joseph Riche; 3 May 1877 – 11 May 1950) was a French painter, engraver, and illustrator.
