= Jean de Tinan =

French writer (1874–1898)

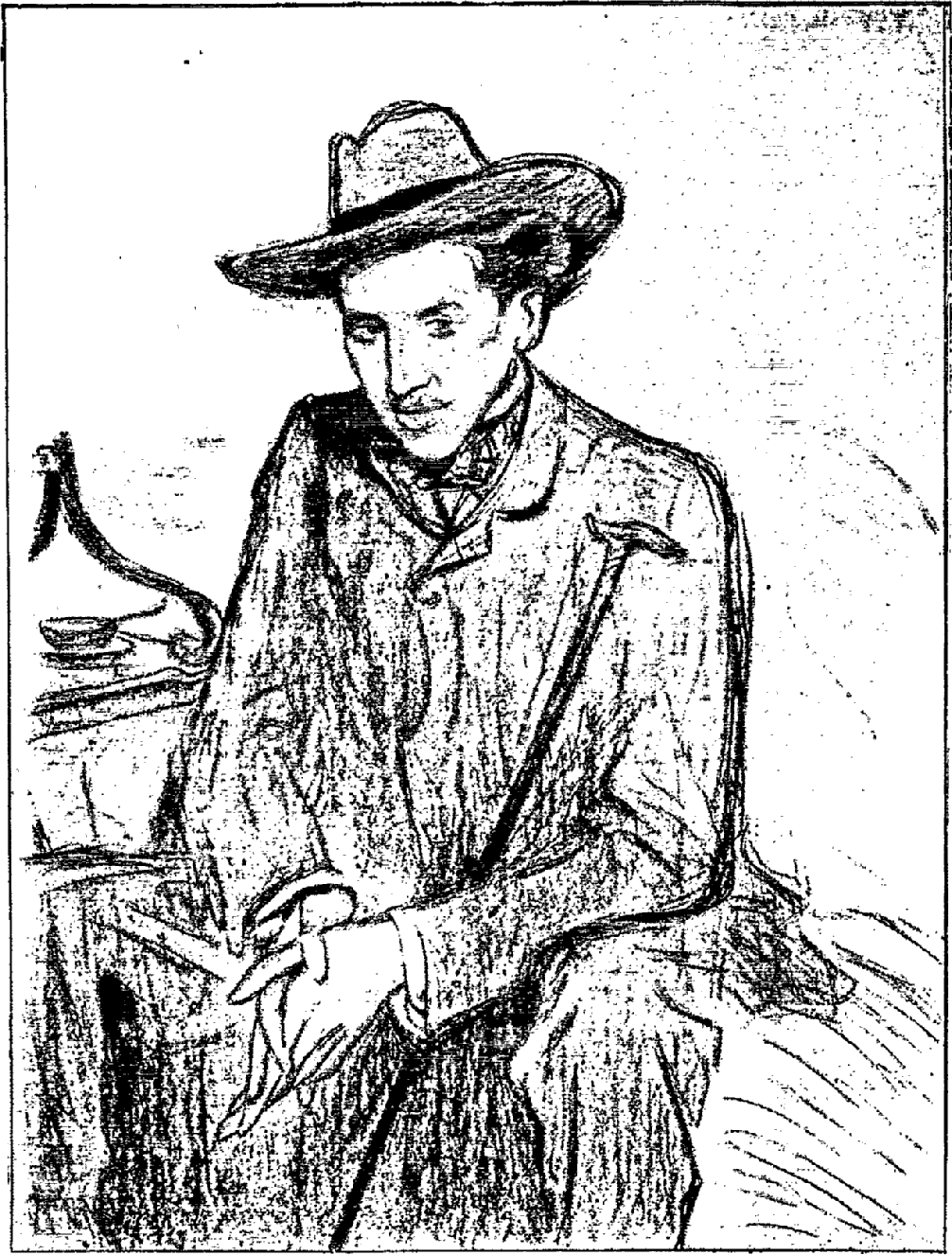
- Born: 19 January 1874; Paris, France
- Died: 18 November 1898 (aged 24); Paris, France
- Resting place: Père Lachaise Cemetery
- Other name: Jean Le Barbier de Tinan
- Occupation: Writer

Jean de Tinan (19 January 1874 – 18 November 1898), also known as Jean Le Barbier de Tinan, was a French writer.

== Biography ==
Born on January 19 1874, in Paris, France, to a Eugène Jean-Marie Théodose Le Barbier de Tinan and Valentine Derval. He would grow up with his grandmother and aunt instead of his parents Jean de Tinan moved to Paris in 1895 after graduating from the School of Agriculture in Montpellier.

He acted as ghostwriter for Willy for two of his novels: Maîtresse d'esthètes and Un vilain Monsieur!

He is remembered as a figure of the Belle Époque. He died on November 18 1898 from a stroke in Paris and was buried in Père Lachaise Cemetery.

== Bibliography ==
- Un document sur l'impuissance d'aimer (1894)
- Penses-tu réussir ! (1897)
- Maîtresse d'esthètes (1897)
- L'Example de Ninon de Lenclos amoureuse (1898)
- Un villain monsieur (1898)
- Aimienne ou le détournement de mineure (1899)

== Film adaptations ==
In 2002, a film was made on his novel Le Doux amour des hommes.

== Literary significance ==
Stéphane Mallarmé referred to his Penses-tu réussir! as a modern version of Gustave Flaubert's Sentimental Education.
