= Pierre Mornand =

Pierre Mornand

Pierre Mornand (1884-1972) was a French writer and bibliophile. He was the editor-in-chief of Le Courrier graphique.

== Selected publications ==
- Trente Artistes du Livre. Éditions Marval, 1945.
- Vingt-Deux Artistes du Livre. Le Courrier graphique, 1948.
- Vingt Artistes du Livre. Le Courrier graphique, 1950.
