= Le Courrier graphique =

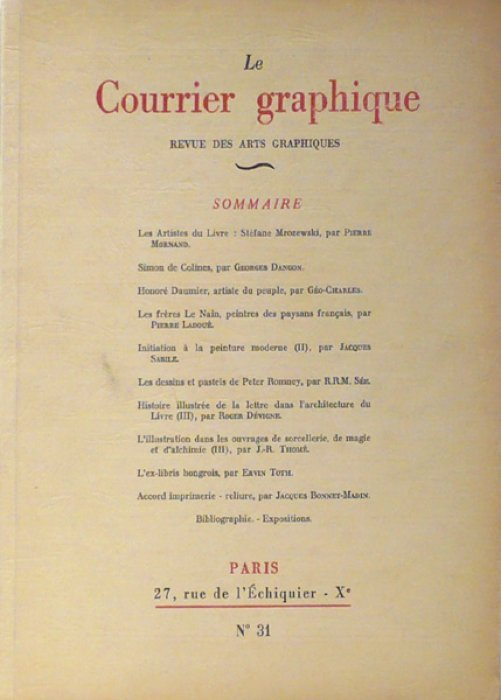
Le Courrier graphique

Le Courrier graphique. Revue des arts graphiques was a twentieth century French magazine of the graphic arts published in Paris. It was first published in 1936 and ceased with edition number 118 in 1962. It was produced under the direction of Albert Cymboliste and the editor-in-chief was Pierre Mornand.

== References and sources ==
Sources

- French VII Bibliography: Bibliography of Critical and Biographical References for the Study of Contemporary French Literature. Modern Language Association of America. Bibliography Committee for French VII (Contemporary Literature), French Institute in the United States, Associated University Press, 1949.
