= Maurice Magre =

French writer, poet, and playwright

Maurice Magre (Occitan: Maurici Magre; 2 March 1877 - 11 December 1941) was a French writer, poet, and playwright.

He was an ardent defender of Occitan, and did much to publicize the martyrdom of the Cathars in the 13th century. For his historical novels on Catharism, Magre is particularly in line with the historian Napoléon Peyrat, in the sense that the author often prefers legends and the romantic epic to historical truth.

== Biography ==
The son of a subprefect, he wrote his first poems at the age of fourteen. His first collections of poetry were published in 1895 in a small magazine called Les Essais de jeunes, to which Jean Viollis and Marc Lafargue also contributed. After moving to Paris to study law, he met the poet and novelist Saint-Georges de Bouhélier and had four collections of poetry published there beginning in 1898. He served as secretary to an actor and later to the playwright Henry Bataille.

During the first part of his life, living in a seedy hotel on Rue Serpente, he led a bohemian and dissolute life and even became an Opium addict. He experimented with every form of pleasure and sought out every kind of ecstasy. This period of decadence inspired some of his works, such as Advice to a Poor Young Man Who Comes to Paris to Write Literature, The Conquest of Women: Advice to a Young Man, and Confessions: On Women, Love, Opium, the Ideal, etc. Despite his scandalous reputation, he nevertheless became a famous and popular author. On the occasion of the publication of one of his books in 1924, Le Figaro wrote: “Magre is an anarchist, an individualist, a sadist, an opium addict. He has every flaw, yet he is a truly great writer. His work is a must-read.”

In the second half of his life, he became interested in esotericism and embarked on a spiritual quest; he became a Martinism but continued to publish numerous works, as evidenced by the list of his works.

In 1919, he discovered The Secret Doctrine, the best-known work by Helena Blavatsky, the co-founder of the Theosophical Society. In May of that same year, he and Pierre-Silvestre founded La Rose rouge, a weekly magazine that ceased publication the following August, after its sixteenth issue. In 1924, he received the Archon-Despérouses Prize for La porte du mystère. In 1935, despite being ill, he undertook a journey to India to meet Sri Aurobindo at his ashram in Pondicherry, which inspired his book L’Ashram de Pondichéry. In Pursuit of Wisdom. On July 26, 1937, together with Francis Rolt-Wheeler, he founded the short-lived “Society of Friends of Montségur and the Holy Grail, of Sabarthez and of Occitania”: although it was not dissolved until 1942 by the Vichy France, it effectively existed for only one year; in July 1938, during the general assembly, all its members resigned, rejecting Rolt-Wheeler's attempt to take control of the Society.

Claude Magre is buried at the Terre-Cabade Cemetery in Toulouse, where his grave can be seen.

He is the brother of Prefect André Magre (1873–1949), who served as secretary-general of the Office of the President of the Republic throughout Albert Lebrun term in office.

== Novels ==
- L'Appel de la bête (1920)
- Les Colombes poignardées (1917)
- La Tendre Camarade (1918)
- Priscilla d'Alexandrie (1925)
- La Vie amoureuse de Messaline (1925)
- La Vie des Courtisanes (1925)
- La Luxure de Grenade (1926)
- Le Mystère du Tigre (1927)
- Lucifer (1929)
- La Nuit de haschich et d'opium (1929)
- La Lumière de la Chine. Le Roman de Confucius (1927)
- Le Sang de Toulouse. Histoire albigeoise du XIIème siècle (1931)
- Le Trésor des Albigeois (1938)
- Un Français à la cour de l'empereur Akbar. Jean de Fodoas (1939)
- Histoire merveilleuse de Claire d'Amour.
- L'Art de séduire les femmes (1929)
- Le Poison de Goa (1928)

== Poetry ==
- La Chanson des hommes (1898)
- Le Poème de la jeunesse (1901)
- Les Lèvres et le secret (1905–1906)
- Les Belles de Nuit (1913)
- La Montée aux enfers. Poésies (1918)
- La Porte du mystère (1924)
- Le Parc des Rossignols (1940)
